= Oxygen therapy =

Use of oxygen as a medical treatment

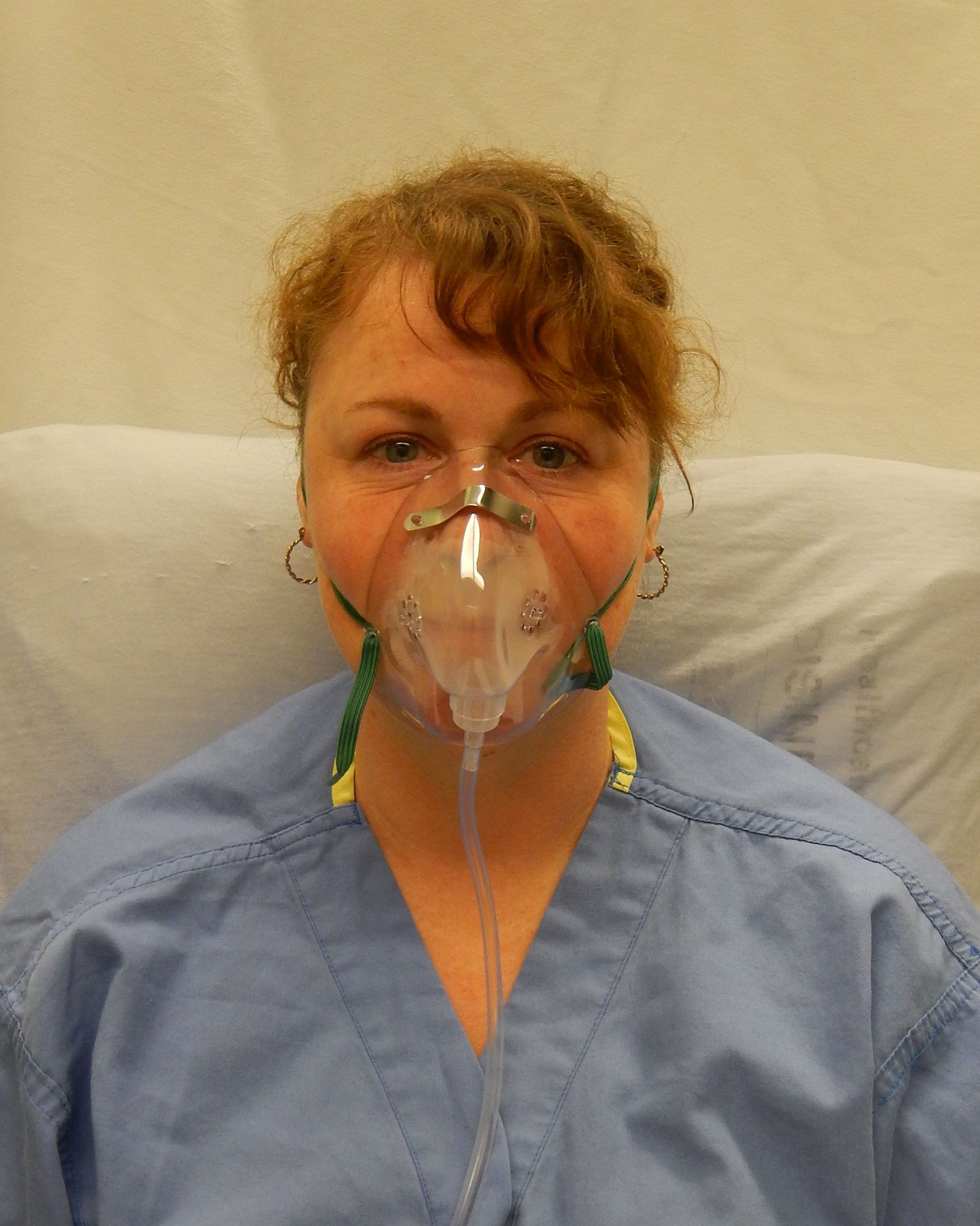
- A person wearing a simple face mask

Clinical data
- Other names: supplemental oxygen, enriched air
- AHFS/Drugs.com: FDA Professional Drug Information
- Routes of administration: inhaled
- Drug class: medical gas
- ATC code: V03AN01 (WHO)

Identifiers
- CAS Number: 7782-44-7
- ChemSpider: none
- UNII: S88TT14065

Chemical and physical data
- Formula: O_{2}

Oxygen therapy, also referred to as supplemental oxygen, is the use of oxygen as medical treatment. Supplemental oxygen can also refer to the use of oxygen enriched air at altitude. Acute indications for therapy include hypoxemia (low blood oxygen levels), carbon monoxide toxicity and cluster headache. It may also be prophylactically given to maintain blood oxygen levels during the induction of anesthesia. Oxygen therapy is often useful in chronic hypoxemia caused by conditions such as severe COPD or cystic fibrosis. Oxygen can be delivered via nasal cannula, face mask, or endotracheal intubation at normal atmospheric pressure, or in a hyperbaric chamber. It can also be given through bypassing the airway, such as in ECMO therapy.

Oxygen is required for normal cellular metabolism. However, excessively high concentrations can result in oxygen toxicity, leading to lung damage and respiratory failure. Higher oxygen concentrations can also increase the risk of airway fires, particularly while smoking. Oxygen therapy can also dry out the nasal mucosa without humidification. In most conditions, an oxygen saturation of 94–96% is adequate, while in those at risk of carbon dioxide retention, saturations of 88–92% are preferred. In cases of carbon monoxide toxicity or cardiac arrest, saturations should be as high as possible. While air is typically 21% oxygen by volume, oxygen therapy can increase O_{2} content of air up to 100%.

The medical use of oxygen first became common around 1917, and is the most common hospital treatment in the developed world. It is currently on the World Health Organization's List of Essential Medicines. Home oxygen can be provided either by oxygen tanks or oxygen concentrator.

== Medical uses ==
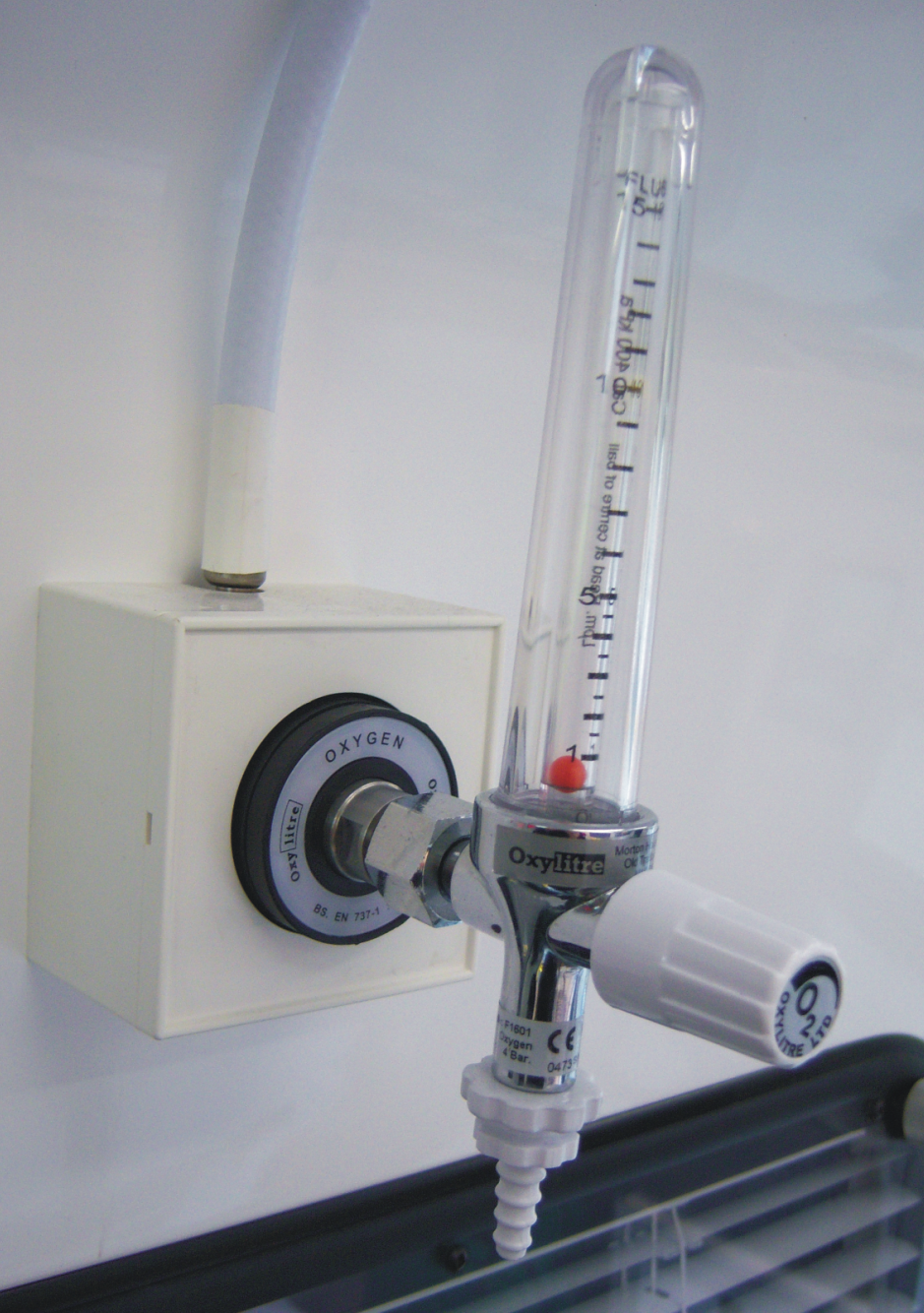
Oxygen piping and regulator with flow meter, for oxygen therapy, mounted in an ambulance

Oxygen is widely used by hospitals, EMS, and first-aid providers in a variety of conditions and settings. A few indications frequently requiring high-flow oxygen include resuscitation, major trauma, anaphylaxis, major bleeding, shock, active convulsions, and hypothermia.

=== Acute conditions ===
In context of acute hypoxemia, oxygen therapy should be titrated to a target level based on pulse oximetry (94–96% in most patients, or 88–92% in people with COPD). This can be performed by increasing oxygen delivery, described as F_{I}O_{2}(fraction of inspired oxygen). In 2018, the British Medical Journal recommended that oxygen therapy be stopped for saturations greater than 96% and not started for saturations above 90 to 93%. This may be due to an association between excessive oxygenation in the acutely ill and increased mortality. Exceptions to these recommendations include carbon monoxide poisoning, cluster headaches, sickle cell crisis, and pneumothorax.

Oxygen therapy has also been used as emergency treatment for decompression sickness for years. Recompression in a hyperbaric chamber with 100% oxygen is the standard treatment for decompression illness. The success of recompression therapy is greatest if given within four hours after resurfacing, with earlier treatment associated with a decreased number of recompression treatments required for resolution. It has been suggested in literature that heliox may be a better alternative to oxygen therapy.

In the context of stroke, oxygen therapy may be beneficial as long as hyperoxic environments are avoided.

People receiving outpatient oxygen therapy for hypoxemia following acute illness or hospitalization should be re-assessed by a physician prior to prescription renewal to gauge the necessity of ongoing oxygen therapy. If the initial hypoxemia has resolved, additional treatment may be an unnecessary use of resources.

=== Chronic conditions ===
Common conditions which may require a baseline of supplementary oxygen include chronic obstructive pulmonary disease (COPD), chronic bronchitis, and emphysema. Patients may also require additional oxygen during acute exacerbations. Oxygen may also be prescribed for breathlessness, end-stage cardiac failure, respiratory failure, advanced cancer, or neurodegenerative disease in spite of relatively normal blood oxygen levels. Physiologically, it may be indicated in people with arterial oxygen partial pressure PaO_{2} ≤ 55mmHg (7.3kPa) or arterial oxygen saturation SaO_{2} ≤ 88%.

Careful titration of oxygen therapy should be considered in patients with chronic conditions predisposing them to carbon dioxide retention (e.g., COPD, emphysema). In these instances, oxygen therapy may decrease respiratory drive, leading to accumulation of carbon dioxide (hypercapnia), acidemia, and increased mortality secondary to respiratory failure. Improved outcomes have been observed with titrated oxygen treatment largely due to gradual improvement of the ventilation/perfusion ratio. The risks associated with loss of respiratory drive are far outweighed by the risks of withholding emergency oxygen, so emergency administration of oxygen is never contraindicated. Transfer from the field to definitive care with titrated oxygen typically occurs long before significant reductions to the respiratory drive are observed.

=== Contraindications ===
There are certain situations in which oxygen therapy has been shown to negatively impact a person's condition.

- Oxygen therapy can exacerbate the effects of paraquat poisoning and should be withheld unless severe respiratory distress or respiratory arrest is present. Paraquat poisoning is rare, with about 200 deaths globally from 1958 to 1978.
- Oxygen therapy is not recommended for people with pulmonary fibrosis or bleomycin-associated lung damage.
- ARDS caused by acid aspiration may be exacerbated with oxygen therapy according to some animal studies.
- Hyperoxic environments should be avoided in cases of sepsis.
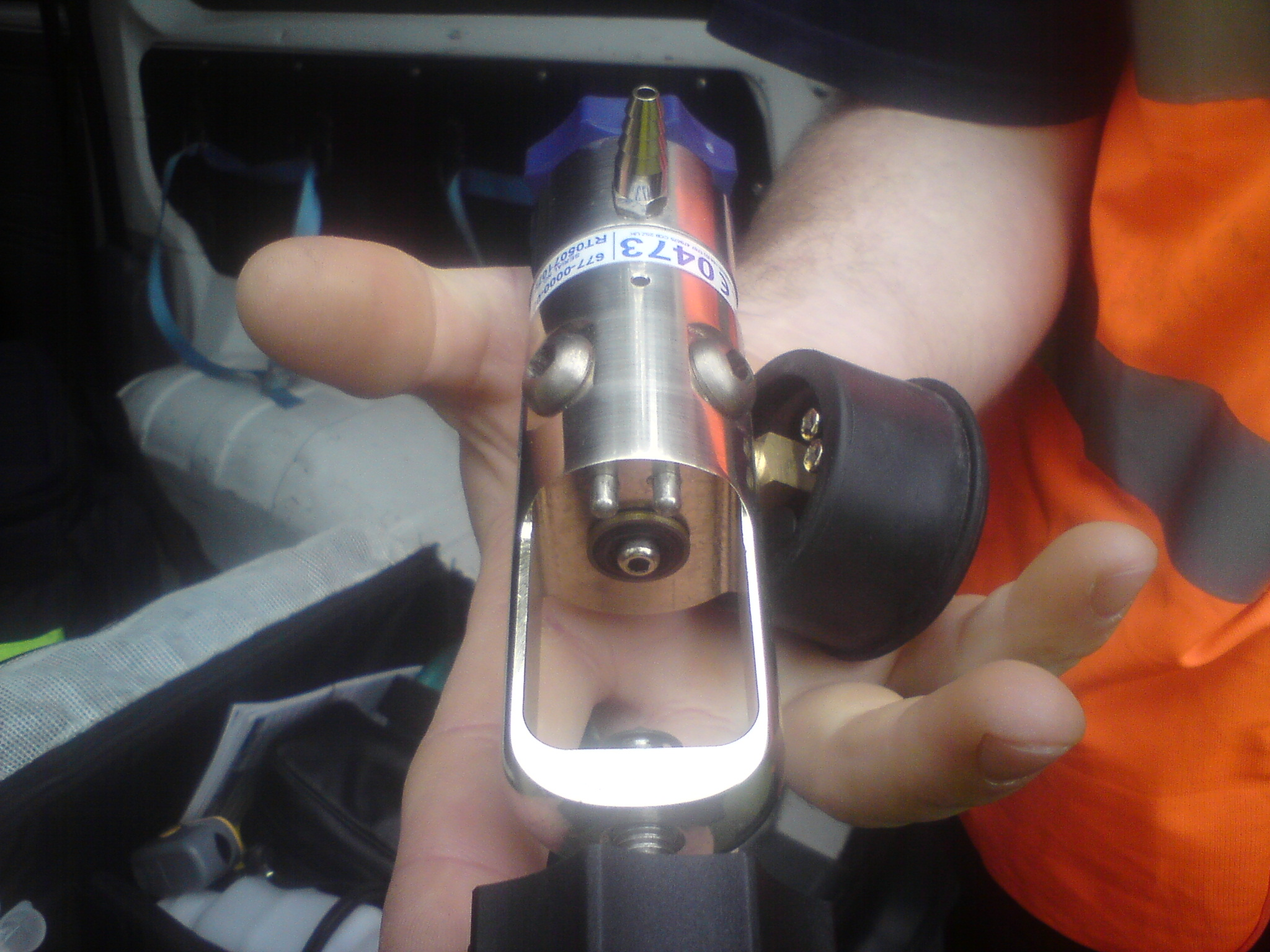
  Pin-indexed Oxygen Regulator for portable D-Cylinder, usually carried in an ambulance's resuscitation kit

=== Adverse effects ===
In some instances, oxygen delivery can lead to particular complications in population subsets.

- In infants with respiratory failure, administration of high levels of oxygen can sometimes promote overgrowth of new blood vessels in the eye leading to blindness. This phenomenon is known as retinopathy of prematurity (ROP).
- In rare instances, people receiving hyperbaric oxygen therapy have had seizures, which has been previously attributed to oxygen toxicity.
- There is some evidence that extended HBOT can accelerate development of cataracts.

=== Alternative medicine ===
Some practitioners of alternative medicine have promoted "oxygen therapy" as a cure for many human ailments including AIDS, Alzheimer's disease and cancer. According to the American Cancer Society, "available scientific evidence does not support claims that putting oxygen-releasing chemicals into a person's body is effective in treating cancer", and some of these treatments can be dangerous.

== Physiologic effects ==
Oxygen supplementation has a variety of physiologic effects on the human body. Whether or not these effects are adverse to a patient is dependent upon clinical context. Cases in which an excess amount of oxygen is available to organs is known as hyperoxia. While the following effects may observed with noninvasive high-dose oxygen therapy (i.e., not ECMO), delivery of oxygen at higher pressures is associated with exacerbation of the following associated effects.

=== Absorption atelectasis ===
It has been hypothesized that oxygen therapy may promote accelerated development of atelectasis (partial or complete lung collapse), as well as denitrogenation of gas cavities (e.g., pneumothorax, pneumocephalus). This concept is based on the idea that oxygen is more quickly absorbed compared to nitrogen within the body, leading oxygen-rich areas that are poorly ventilated to be rapidly absorbed, leading to atelectasis. It is thought that higher fractions of inhaled oxygen (F_{I}O_{2}) are associated with increasing rates of atelectasis in the clinical scenario. In clinically healthy adults, it is believed that absorption atelectasis typically does not have any significant implications when managed properly.

=== Airway inflammation ===
In regard to the airway, both tracheobronchitis and mucositis have been observed with high levels of oxygen delivery (typically >40% O2). Within the lungs, these elevated concentrations of oxygen have been associated with increased alveolar toxicity (coined the Lorrain-Smith effect). Mucosal damage is observed to increase with elevated atmospheric pressure and oxygen concentrations, which may result in the development of ARDS and possibly death.

=== Central nervous system effects ===
Decreased cerebral blood flow and intracranial pressure (ICP) have been reported in hyperoxic conditions, with mixed results regarding impact on cognition. Hyperoxia as also been associated with seizures, cataract formation, and reversible myopia.

=== Hypercapnea ===
Among CO_{2} retainers, excess exposure to oxygen in context of the Haldane effect causes decreased binding of deoxyhemoglobin to CO_{2} in the blood. This unloading of CO_{2} may contribute to the development of acid-base disorders due to the associated increase in PaCO2 (hypercapnea). Patients with underlying lung disease such as COPD may not be able to adequately clear the additional CO_{2} produced by this effect, worsening their condition. In addition, oxygen therapy has also been shown to decrease respiratory drive, further contributing to possible hypercapnea.

=== Immunological effects ===
Hyperoxic environments have been observed to decrease granulocyte rolling and diapedesis in specific circumstances in humans. In regard to anaerobic infections, cases of necrotizing fasciitis have been observed to require fewer debridement operations and have improvement in regard to mortality in patients treated with hyperbaric oxygen therapy. This may stem from oxygen intolerance of otherwise anaerobic microorganisms.

=== Oxidative stress ===
Sustained exposure to oxygen may overwhelm the body's capacity to deal with oxidative stress. Rates of oxidative stress appears to be influenced by both oxygen concentration and length of exposure, with general toxicity observed to occur within hours in certain hyperoxic conditions.

=== Reduction in erythropoiesis ===
Hyperoxia is observed to result in a serum reduction in erythropoietin, resulting in reduced stimulus for erythropoiesis. Hyperoxia at normobaric environments does not appear to be able to halt erythropoiesis completely.

=== Pulmonary vasodilation ===
Within the lungs, hypoxia is observed to be a potent pulmonary vasoconstrictor, due to inhibition of an outward potassium current and activation of inward sodium current leading to pulmonary vascular muscular contraction. However, the effects of hyperoxia do not seem to have a particularly strong vasodilatory effect from the few studies that have been performed on patients with pulmonary hypertension. As a result, an effect appears to be present but minor.

=== Systemic vasoconstriction ===
In the systemic vasculature, oxygen serves as a vasoconstrictor, leading to mildly increased blood pressure and decreased cardiac output and heart rate. Hyperbaric conditions do not seem to have a significant impact on these overall physiologic effects. Clinically, this may lead to increased left-to-right shunting in certain patient populations, such as those with atrial septal defect. While the mechanism of the vasoconstriction is unknown, one proposed theory is that increased reactive oxygen species from oxygen therapy accelerates the degradation of endothelial nitric oxide, a vasodilator. These vasoconstrictive effects are thought to be the underlying mechanism helping to abort cluster headaches.

Dissolved oxygen in hyperoxic conditions may make also a significant contribution to total gas transport.

== Storage and sources ==
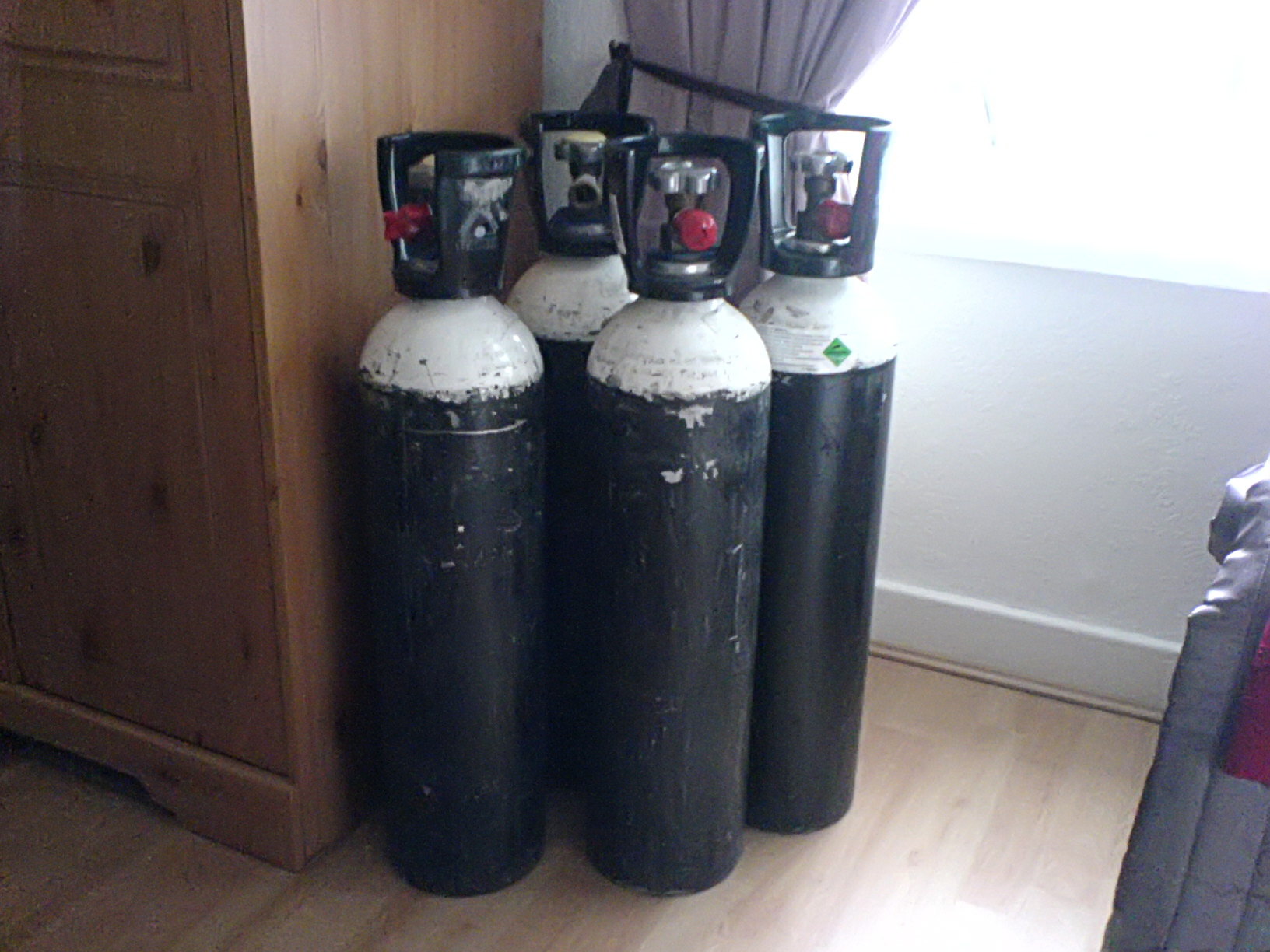
High pressure gas cylinders containing oxygen to be used at home. When in use, a regulator is connected to the cylinder valve and delivers gas at a constant low pressure through a hose to a mask that fits over a person's nose and mouth.

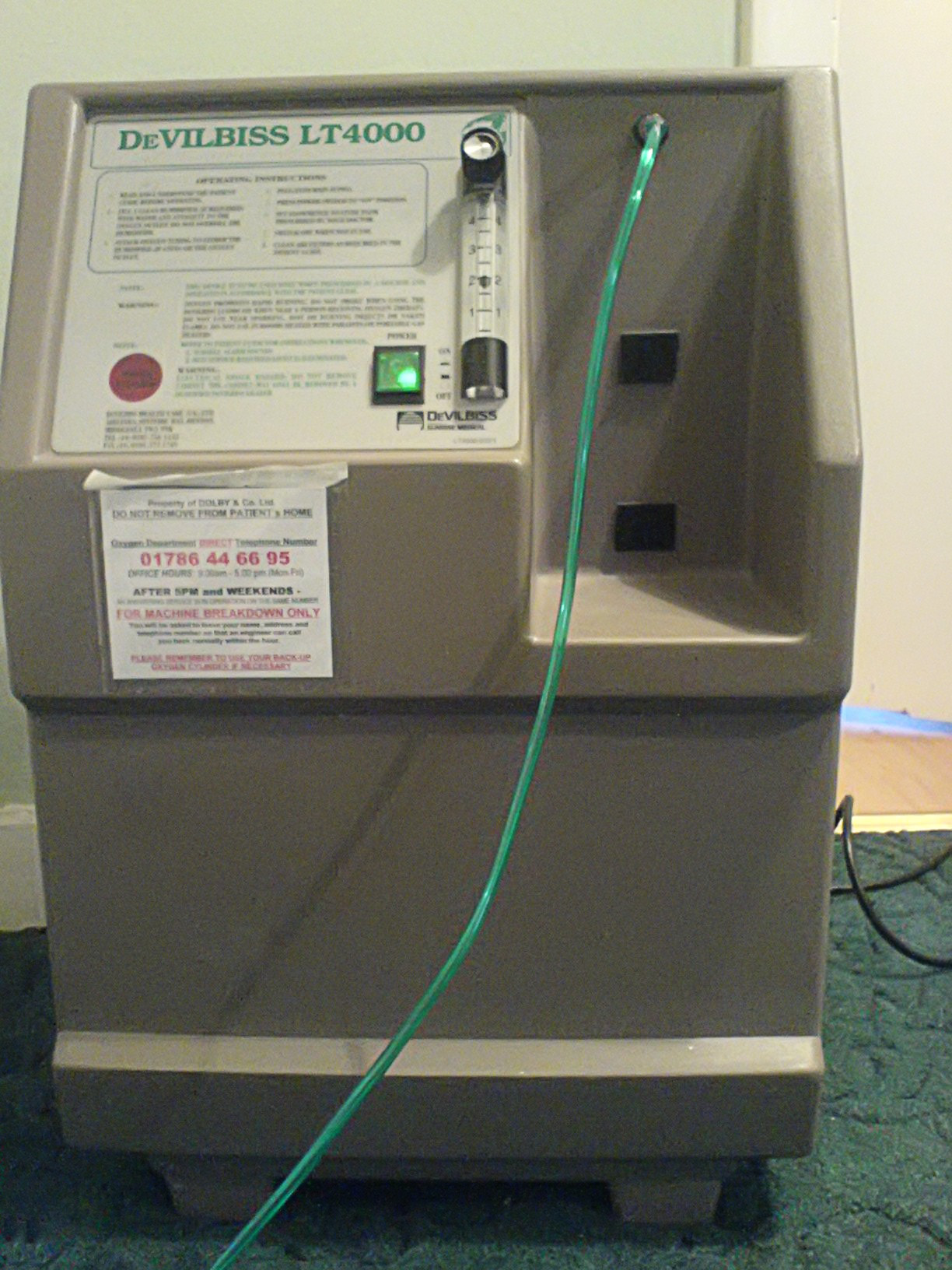
A home oxygen concentrator for a person with emphysema

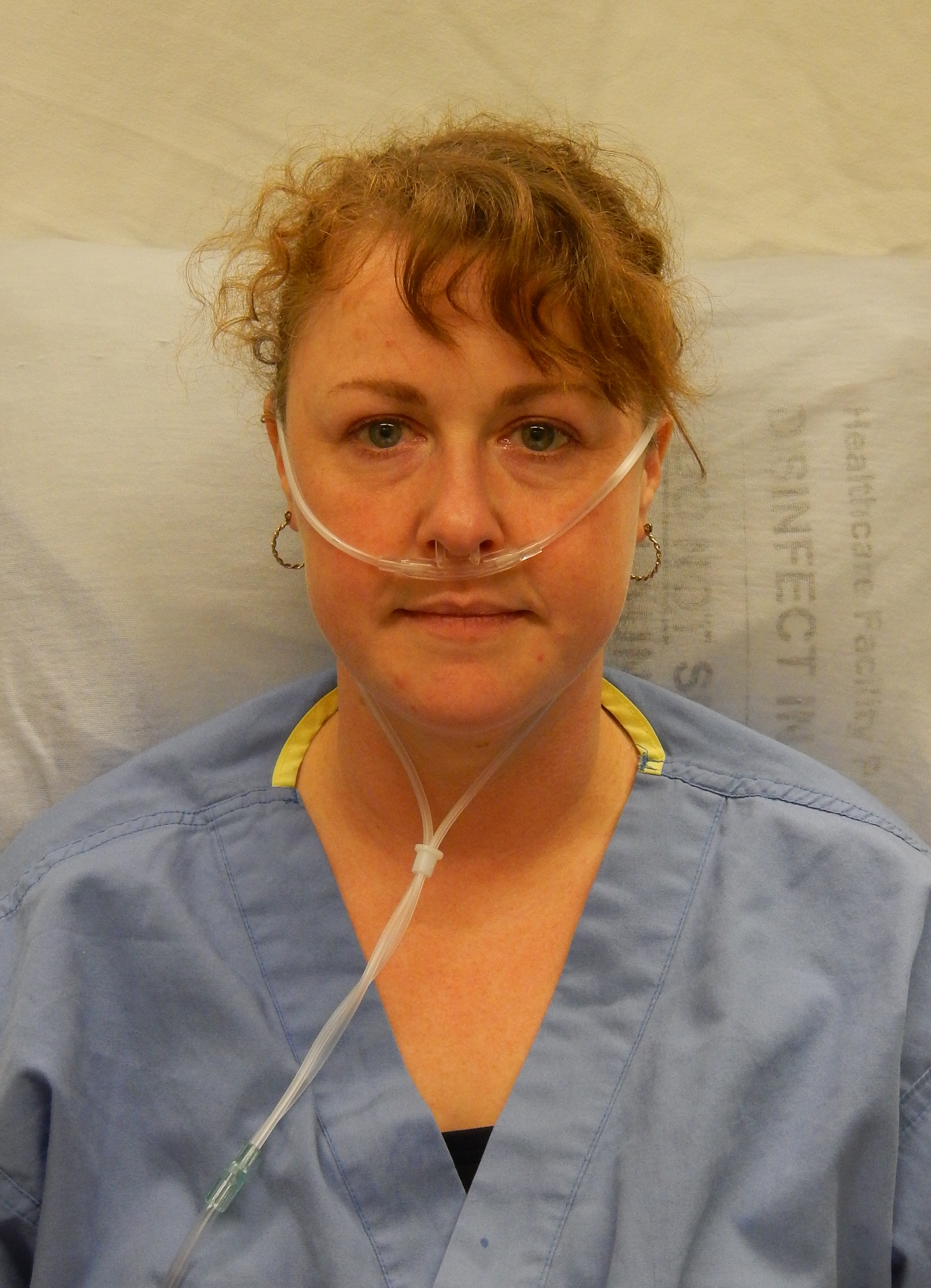
Nasal cannula

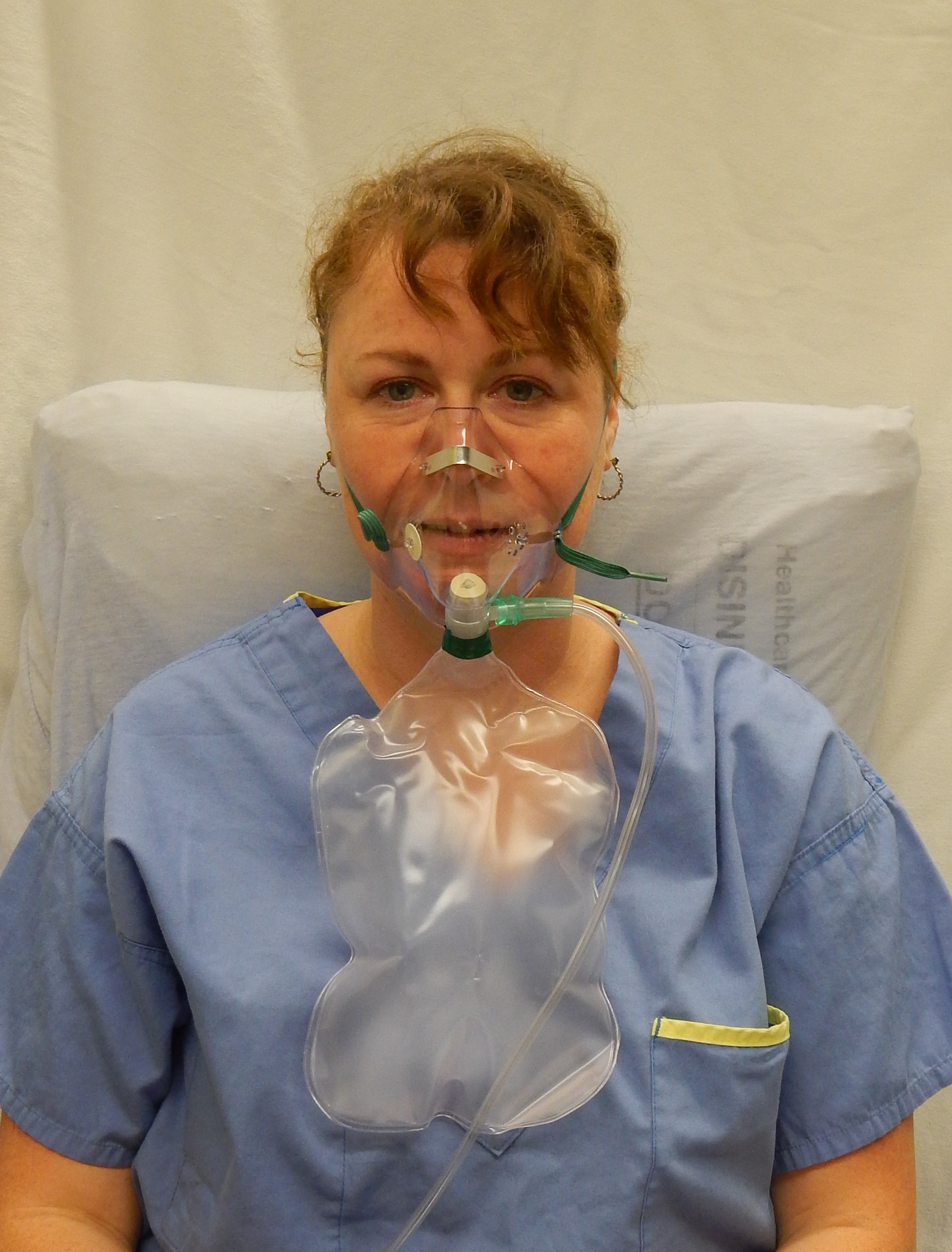
Non-rebreather mask

Oxygen can be separated by a number of methods (e.g., chemical reaction, fractional distillation) to enable immediate or future use. The main methods utilized for oxygen therapy include:

1. Liquid storage – Liquid oxygen is stored in insulated tanks at low temperature and allowed to boil (at a temperature of 90.188 K (−182.96 °C)) during use, releasing gaseous oxygen. This method is widely utilized at hospitals due to high oxygen requirements. See Vacuum Insulated Evaporator for more information on this method of storage.
2. Compressed gas storage – Oxygen gas is compressed in a gas cylinder, which provides a convenient storage method (refrigeration not required). Large oxygen cylinders hold a volume of 6,500 litres (230 cu ft) and can last about two days at a flow rate of 2 litres per minute (LPM). A small portable M6 (B) cylinder holds 164 or 170 litres (5.8 or 6.0 cu ft) and weighs about 1.3 to 1.6 kilograms (2.9 to 3.5 lb). These tanks can last 4–6 hours with a conserving regulator, which adjust flow based on a person's breathing rate. Conserving regulators may not be effective for patients who breathe through their mouth.
3. Instant usage – The use of an electrically powered oxygen concentrator or a chemical reaction based unit can create sufficient oxygen for immediate personal use. These units (especially the electrically powered versions) are widely used for home oxygen therapy as portable personal oxygen. One particular advantage includes continuous supply without need for bulky oxygen cylinders.

=== Hazards and risk ===
Highly concentrated sources of oxygen also increase risk for rapid combustion. Oxygen itself is not flammable, but the addition of concentrated oxygen to a fire greatly increases its intensity, and can aid the combustion of materials that are relatively inert under normal conditions. Fire and explosion hazards exist when concentrated oxidants and fuels are brought together in close proximity, although an ignition event (e.g., heat or spark) is needed to trigger combustion.

Concentrated oxygen will allow combustion to proceed rapidly and energetically. Steel pipes and storage vessels used to store and transmit both gaseous and liquid oxygen will act as a fuel; and therefore the design and manufacture of oxygen systems requires special training to ensure that ignition sources are minimized. Highly concentrated oxygen in a high-pressure environment can spontaneously ignite hydrocarbons such as oil and grease, resulting in a fire or explosion. The heat caused by rapid pressurization serves as the ignition source. For this reason, storage vessels, regulators, piping and any other equipment used with highly concentrated oxygen must be "oxygen-clean" prior to use to ensure the absence of potential fuels. This does not only apply to pure oxygen; any concentration significantly higher than atmospheric (approximately 21%) carries a potential ignition risk.

Some hospitals have instituted "no-smoking" policies which can help keep ignition sources away from medically piped oxygen. These policies do not eliminate the risk of injury among patients with portable oxygen systems, especially among smokers. Other potential sources of ignition include candles, aromatherapy, medical equipment, cooking, and deliberate vandalism.

== Delivery ==
Various devices are used for oxygen administration. In most cases, the oxygen will first pass through a pressure regulator, used to control the high pressure of oxygen delivered from a cylinder (or other source) to a lower pressure. This lower pressure is then controlled by a flowmeter (which may be preset or selectable) which controls the flow at a measured rate (e.g., litres per minute [LPM]). The typical flowmeter range for medical oxygen is between 0 and 15 LPM with some units capable of obtaining up to 25 LPM. Many wall flowmeters using a Thorpe tube design are able to be dialed to "flush" oxygen which is beneficial in emergency situations.

=== Low-dose oxygen ===
Many people only require slight increases in inhaled oxygen, rather than pure or near-pure oxygen. These requirements can be met through a number of devices dependent on situation, flow requirements, and personal preference.

A nasal cannula (NC) is a thin tube with two small nozzles inserted into a person's nostrils. It can provide oxygen at low flow rates, 1–6 litres per minute (LPM), delivering an oxygen concentration of 24–40%.

There are also a number of face mask options, such as the simple face mask, often used at between 5 and 10 LPM, capable of delivering oxygen concentrations between 35% and 55%. This is closely related to the more controlled air-entrainment masks, also known as Venturi masks, which can accurately deliver a predetermined oxygen concentration from 24 to 50%.

In some instances, a partial rebreathing mask can be used, which is based on a simple mask, but features a reservoir bag, which can provide oxygen concentrations of 40–70% at 5–15 LPM.

Demand oxygen delivery systems (DODS) or oxygen resuscitators deliver oxygen only when the person inhales or the caregiver presses a button on the mask (e.g., nonbreathing patient). These systems greatly conserve oxygen compared to steady-flow masks, and are useful in emergency situations when a limited supply of oxygen is available and there is a delay in transporting the person to higher care. Due to utilization of a variety of methods for oxygenation requirements performance differences arise. They are very useful in CPR, as the caregiver can deliver rescue breaths composed of 100% oxygen with the press of a button. Care must be taken not to over-inflate the person's lungs, for which some systems employ safety valves. These systems may not be appropriate for people who are unconscious or in respiratory distress because of the required respiratory effort.

=== High flow oxygen delivery ===
For patients requiring high concentrations of oxygen, a number of devices are available. The most commonly utilized device is the non-rebreather mask (or reservoir mask). Non-rebreather masks draw oxygen from attached reservoir bags with one-way valves that direct exhaled air out of the mask. If flow rate is not sufficient (~10L/min), the bag may collapse on inspiration. This type of mask is indicated for acute medical emergencies. The delivered F_{I}O_{2} (Inhalation volumetric fraction of molecular oxygen) of this system is 60–80%, depending on oxygen flow and breathing pattern.

Another type of device is a humidified high flow nasal cannula which enables flows exceeding a person's peak inspiratory flow demand to be delivered via nasal cannula, thus providing F_{I}O_{2} of up to 100% because there is no entrainment of room air. This also allows the person to continue to talk, eat, and drink while still receiving therapy. This type of delivery method is associated with greater overall comfort, improved oxygenation, respiratory rates and reduced sputumstatis compared with face mask oxygen.

In specialist applications such as aviation, tight-fitting masks can be used. These masks also have applications in anaesthesia, carbon monoxide poisoning treatment and in hyperbaric oxygen therapy.

=== Positive pressure delivery ===
Patients who are unable to breathe on their own will require positive pressure to move oxygen into their lungs for gaseous exchange to take place. Systems for delivery vary in complexity and cost, starting with a basic pocket mask adjunct which can be used to manually deliver artificial respiration with supplemental oxygen delivered through a mask port.

Many emergency medical service members, first aid personnel, and hospital staff may use a bag-valve-mask (BVM), which is a malleable bag attached to a face mask (or invasive airway such as an endotracheal tube or laryngeal mask airway), usually with a reservoir bag attached, which is manually manipulated by the healthcare professional to push oxygen (or air) into the lungs. This is the only procedure allowed for initial treatment of cyanide poisoning in the UK workplace.

Automated versions of the BVM system, known as a resuscitator or pneupac can also deliver measured and timed doses of oxygen directly to people through a facemask or airway. These systems are related to the anaesthetic machines used in operations under general anaesthesia that allow a variable amount of oxygen to be delivered, along with other gases including air, nitrous oxide and inhalational anaesthetics.

=== Drug delivery ===
Oxygen and other compressed gases are used in conjunction with a nebulizer to allow delivery of medications to the upper and/or lower airways. Nebulizers use compressed gas to propel liquid medication into therapeutically sized aerosol droplets for deposition to the appropriate portion of the airway. A typical compressed gas flow rate of 8–10 L/min is used to nebulize medications, saline, sterile water, or a combination these treatments into a therapeutic aerosol for inhalation. In the clinical setting, room air (ambient mix of several gasses), molecular oxygen, and Heliox are the most common gases used to nebulize a bolus treatment or a continuous volume of therapeutic aerosols.

=== Exhalation filters for oxygen masks ===
Filtered oxygen masks have the ability to prevent exhaled particles from being released into the surrounding environment. These masks are normally of a closed design such that leaks are minimized and breathing of room air is controlled through a series of one-way valves. Filtration of exhaled breaths is accomplished either by placing a filter on the exhalation port or through an integral filter that is part of the mask itself. These masks first became popular in the Toronto (Canada) healthcare community during the 2003 SARS Crisis. SARS was identified as being respiratory based, and it was determined that conventional oxygen therapy devices were not designed for the containment of exhaled particles. In 2003, the HiOx^{80} oxygen mask was released for sale. The HiOx^{80} mask is a closed design mask that allows a filter to be placed on the exhalation port. Several new designs have emerged in the global healthcare community for the containment and filtration of potentially infectious particles. Other designs include the ISO-O_{2} oxygen mask, the Flo_{2}Max oxygen mask, and the O-Mask.

Typical oxygen masks allow a person to breathe in a mixture of room air and therapeutic oxygen. However, as filtered oxygen masks use a closed design that minimizes or eliminates the person's contact with and ability to inhale room air, delivered oxygen concentrations in such devices have been found to be elevated, approaching 99% using adequate oxygen flows. Because all exhaled particles are contained within the mask, nebulized medications are also prevented from releasing into the surrounding atmosphere, decreasing the occupational exposure to healthcare staff and other people.

=== Aircraft ===
In the United States, most airlines restrict the devices allowed on board an aircraft. As a result, passengers are restricted in what devices they can use. Some airlines will provide cylinders for passengers with an associated fee. Other airlines allow passengers to carry on approved portable concentrators. However, the lists of approved devices varies by airline so passengers may need to check with any airline they are planning to fly on. Passengers are generally not allowed to carry on personal cylinders. In all cases, passengers need to notify the airline in advance of their equipment.

Effective May 13, 2009, the Department of Transportation and FAA ruled that a select number of portable oxygen concentrators are approved for use on all commercial flights. FAA regulations require larger airplanes to carry D-cylinders of oxygen for use in case of an emergency.

=== Oxygen conserving devices ===
Since the 1980s, devices have been available which conserve stored oxygen by delivering it during the portion of the breathing cycle when it is more effectively used. This has the effect of stored oxygen lasting longer, or a smaller, and therefore lighter, portable oxygen delivery system being practicable. This class of device can also be used with portable oxygen concentrators, making them more efficient.

The delivery of supplemental oxygen is most effective if it is made at a point in the breathing cycle when it will be inhaled to the alveoli, where gas transfer occurs. oxygen delivered later in the cycle will be inhaled into physiological dead space, where it serves no useful purpose as it cannot diffuse into the blood. Oxygen delivered during stages of the breathing cycle in which it is not inhaled is also wasted.

A continuous constant flow rate uses a simple regulator, but is inefficient as a high percentage of the delivered gas does not reach the alveoli, and over half is not inhaled at all. A system which accumulates free-flow oxygen during resting and exhalation stages, (reservoir cannulas) makes a larger part of the oxygen available for inhalation, and it will be selectively inhaled during the initial part of inhalation, which reaches furthest into the lungs. A similar function is provided by a mechanical demand regulator which provides gas only during inhalation, but requires some physical effort by the user, and also ventilates dead space with oxygen. A third class of system (pulse dose oxygen conserving device, or demand pulse devices) senses the start of inhalation and provides a metered bolus, which if correctly matched to requirements, will be sufficient and effectively inhaled into the alveoli.Such systems can be pneumatically or electrically controlled.

Adaptive demand systems A development in pulse demand delivery are devices that automatically adjust the volume of the pulsed bolus to suit the activity level of the user. This adaptive response in intended to reduce desaturation responses caused by exercise rate variation.

Pulsed delivery devices are available as stand alone modules or integrated into a system specifically designed to use compressed gas, liquid oxygen or oxygen concentrator sources. Integrated design usually allows optimisation of the system for the source type at the cost of versatility.

Transtracheal oxygen catheters are inserted directly into the trachea through a small opening in the front of the neck for that purpose. The opening is directed downward, towards the bifurcation of the bronchi. Oxygen introduced through the catheter bypasses the dead spaces of the nose, pharynx and upper trachea during inhalation, and during continuous flow, will accumulate in the anatomic dead space at the end of exhalation and be available for immediate inhalation to the alveoli on the following inhalation. This reduces wastage and provides efficiency roughly three times greater than with external continuous flow. This is roughly equivalent to a reservoir cannula. Transtracheal catheters have been found to be effective during rest, exercise and sleep.

== See also ==
- Bottled oxygen (climbing) – Oxygen stored in lightweight portable high pressure cylinders
- Breathing gas – Gas used for human respiration
- Emergency medical services – Services providing acute medical care
- Hyperbaric oxygen therapy – Treatment using oxygen at raised ambient pressure
- Mechanical ventilation – Method to mechanically assist or replace spontaneous breathing
- Nebulizer – Drug delivery device
- Oxygen bar – Establishment that sells oxygen for on-site recreational use
- Oxygen firebreak – Safety mechanism designed to extinguish a fire in a medical oxygen delivery tube
- Oxygen tent – Canopy over a patient to provide supplemental oxygen
- Respiratory therapist – Practitioner in cardio-pulmonary medicine
- Redento D. Ferranti - Early use of oxygen therapy in the U.S. as an effective approach to rehabilitation for COPD patients.
