= Simple face mask =

Plastic mask for oxygen therapy

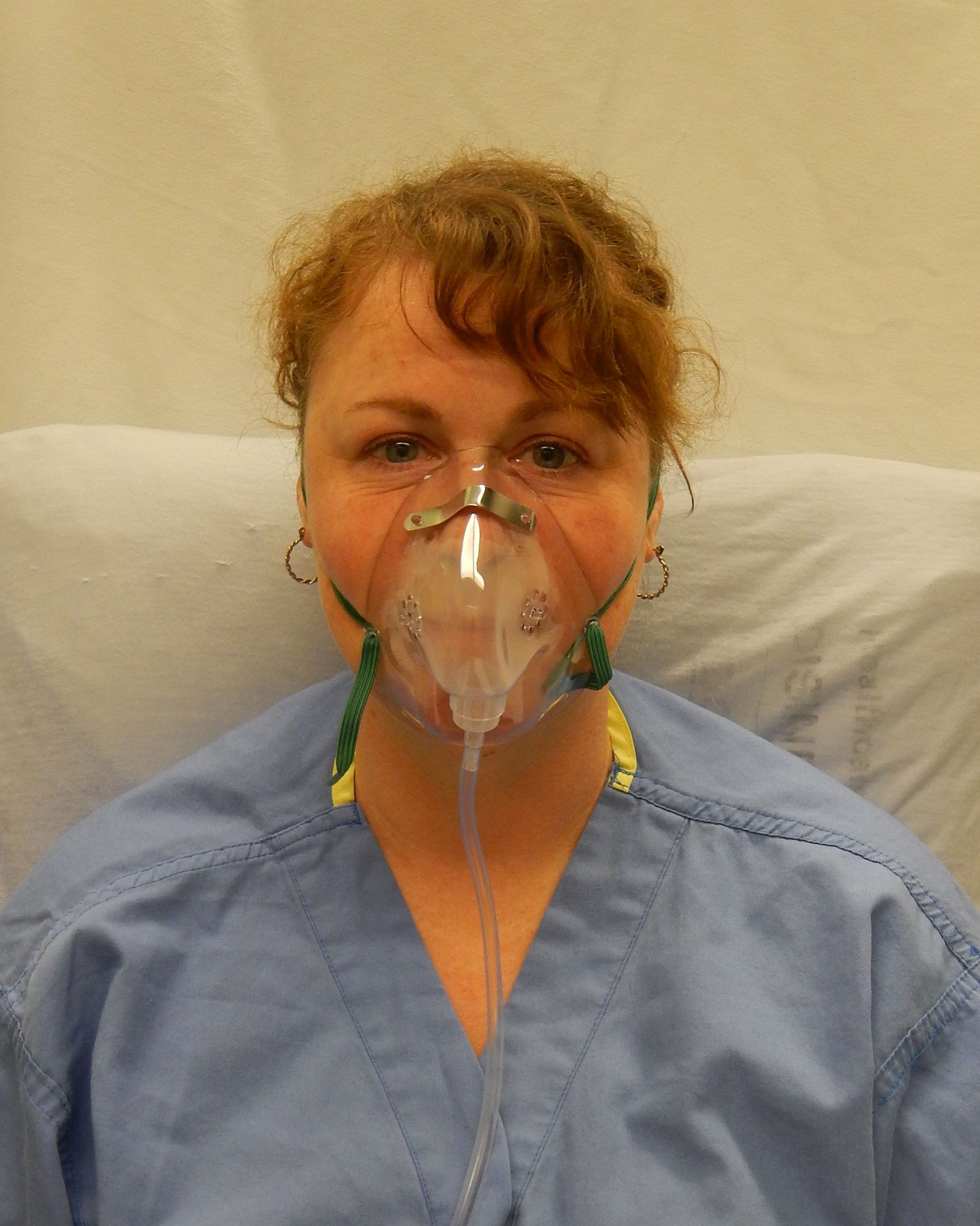
A person wearing a simple face mask.

The simple face mask (SFM) is a basic disposable mask, made of clear plastic, to provide oxygen therapy for patients who are experiencing conditions such as chest pain (possible heart attacks), dizziness, and minor hemorrhages. This mask is only meant for patients who are able to breathe on their own, but who may require a higher oxygen concentration than the 21% concentration found in ambient air. Patients who are unable to breathe on their own are placed on a medical ventilator instead. The simple face mask can deliver higher flow rates than nasal cannula (6–10 liters per minute) for an FiO2 of 30- 60% oxygen. Nasal cannula and simple face masks are described as low flow delivery systems.

Unlike the non-rebreather and partial rebreather masks, the simple face mask lacks a reservoir bag. It also has holes in the mask instead of the non-rebreather's one-way valves, so ambient air can enter the mask. This feature eliminates the danger of suffocation present if a mask with one-way valves becomes disconnected from oxygen. Therefore, the simple face mask is commonly preferred by basic life support personnel such as firefighters, lifeguards and other non-medical rescue personnel trained in basic first aid.

The final oxygen concentration delivered by a simple face mask is dependent upon the amount of room air that mixes with the oxygen the patient breathes. The air mixing is determined by how much air any individual is breathing at the moment, combined with the fit of the mask. Because of the variability in these factors, the final oxygen concentration is somewhat uncontrolled. A venturi device attached to the mask can be used to control to some degree the concentration of oxygen delivered; usually this is used to prevent hypoxia in emphysema patients who have lost the ability to fully inhale. The effectiveness of the therapy can be continuously monitored using a pulse oximeter, though more clinically useful data can be obtained by drawing arterial blood gas.
