= Oxygen firebreak =

Safety mechanism designed to extinguish a fire in a medical oxygen delivery tube

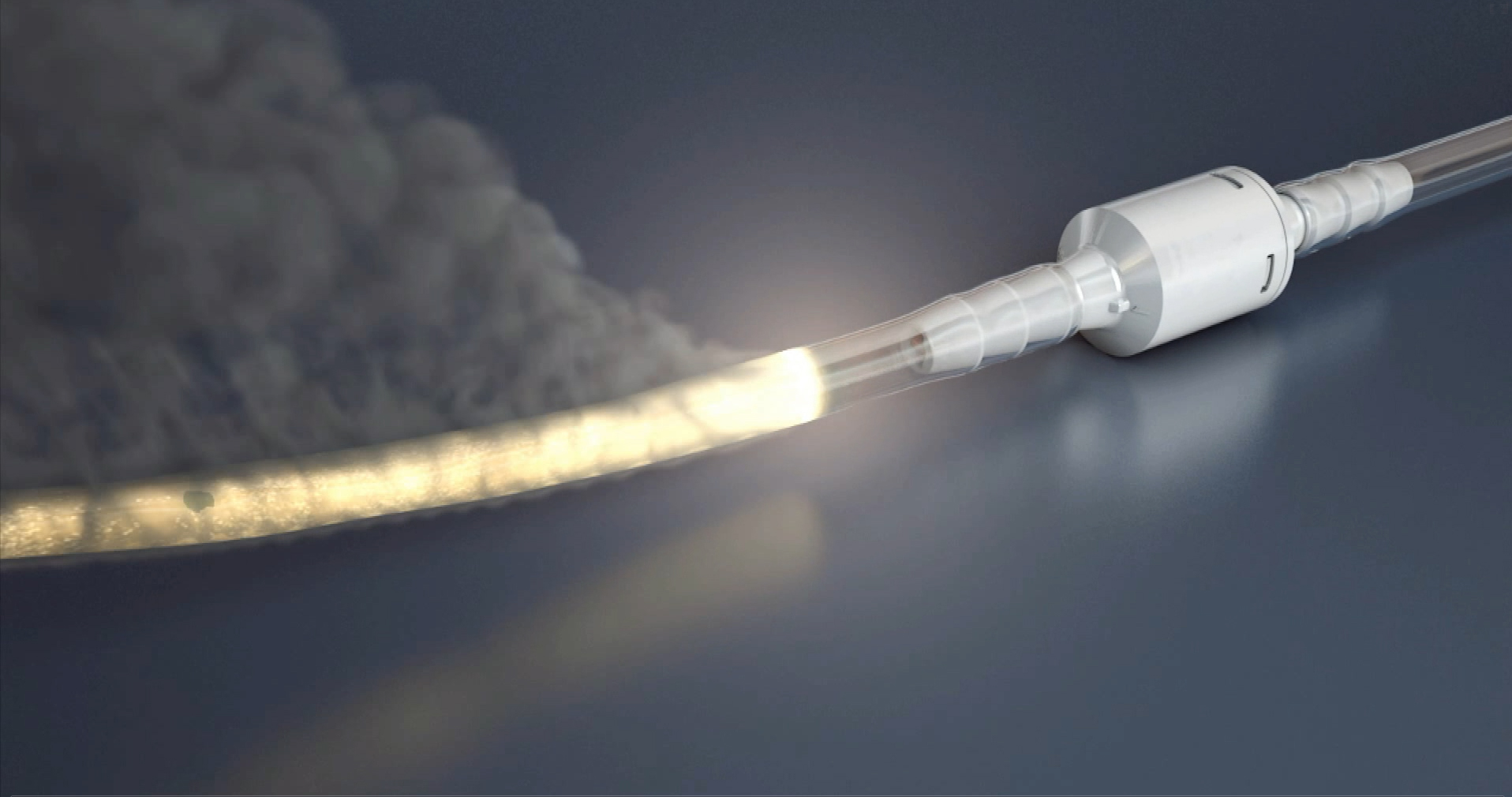
A fire in an oxygen tube approaching an oxygen firebreak

An oxygen firebreak, also known as a fire stop valve or fire safety valve, is a thermal fuse designed to extinguish a fire in the delivery tube being used by a patient on oxygen therapy and stop the flow of oxygen if the tube is accidentally ignited. Oxygen firebreaks are fitted into the oxygen delivery tubing close to the patient, typically around the patient's sternum where the two nasal cannula tubes join and connect to the delivery tubing.

== Home oxygen fires ==
Oxygen is not flammable, but when it is present in increased concentrations it will enable fires to start much more easily. Once a fire has started, if supplemental oxygen is present it will burn more fiercely, based on the principle of the fire triangle. Materials that do not burn in ambient air may burn when there is a greater concentration of oxygen present than there is in air.

Most home oxygen fires are caused by patients smoking whilst using medical oxygen. Other sources of naked flames, such as gas flames and birthday candles, can also pose a risk. Despite the inherent dangers, researchers estimate that between 10 and 50 per cent of home oxygen patients continue to smoke.

Once a fire has started in the patient's nasal cannula it will track back towards the oxygen source and if not stopped may lead to a 'whole house' fire. Whole house fires are directly correlated with single or even multiple deaths. According to the US National Fire Protection Association (NFPA), 25% of oxygen fires get beyond the immediate surrounding area to become 'whole house' fires.

While an oxygen firebreak / thermal fuse cannot stop the initial ignition, it can limit the potential for whole house fires, more serious injury and death. Firebreaks / thermal fuses can also buy more time for a patient and other individuals in the building to escape, and limit the material cost of fire damage.

== Oxygen fire statistics ==
=== United States ===
A study, The prevalence and impact of home oxygen fires in the USA, published in September 2019, analysed media reports of home oxygen fire incidents between December 2017 and August 2019. The report found 311 incidents, resulting in 164 deaths, equivalent to one patient death every four days. It also found that a third of reported incidents referenced exploding cylinders, posing a significant risk to third parties, including emergency services. The study estimates that there are between 100 and 150 deaths every year from home oxygen fires in the US, describing it as a 'material health issue'.

Further research published in November 2021 confirmed that home oxygen fires remain a material public health challenge. The study, Firebreaks: a risk-based approach to safer home oxygen delivery examined media reports of home oxygen fire incidents between August 2019 and July 2021. 256 incidents and 152 deaths were recorded in this 23-month period, equating to a death every four days, consistent with the previous research. Over the total study period of 3.5 years, there were 567 fires involving home oxygen and 316 deaths, including two firefighters who lost their lives. The new report also examines the significant impact of burns resulting from home oxygen fires, drawing on a study by Wake Forest Baptist Medical Center in 2020 which found home oxygen fires cause at least 1,000 burn injuries per year.

In 2008 the NFPA published a report suggesting that there are 46 deaths each year in the US from 182 fires. The report also stated that US hospital emergency rooms deal with an average 1,190 cases of burns each year as a result of home oxygen fires. However, the NFPA describes these statistics as "likely underestimates".

Further analysis by Marty Ahrens on behalf of the NFPA in 2017 recorded a likely average annual death rate for home fires involving oxygen administration equipment of 70 people (or 3% or all home fire deaths), based upon figures between 2011 and 2015. The report also suggested that these fires or burns are becoming more common. In 2019 the NFPA also reported that "medicinal oxygen was involved in 13% of the home smoking material fire deaths".

The United States Fire Administration (USFA) said in a 2015 report that "While no one factor is solely responsible for the increased fire risk to older adults receiving home health care, smoking in the presence of oxygen is recognized as one important problem."

A study of home oxygen therapy patients in the Veterans Health Administration between 2009 and 2015 examined 123 cases of reported adverse events related to flash burns. It found that 100 cases (81%) resulted in injury, and 23 (19%) resulted in death. Although 89% of veterans claimed to have quit smoking, 92% of burns occurred as a result of smoking.

In July 2022, the International Association of Fire Chiefs (IAFC) adopted a position statement on home oxygen fire safety that recommended the use of firebreaks.

=== Europe ===
Not all European countries monitor data on the number of fires that occur as a result of home oxygen. Despite a European Union Medical Device Directive requiring incidents to be reported to national vigilance authorities, there is often inadequate coordination to publish the information centrally. According to the German Federal Institute for Drugs and Medical Devices (Bundesinstitut fur Arzneimittel und Medizinprodukte, BfArM) it is likely that such incidents are grossly under-reported.

Data from the European Industrial Gases Association (EIGA), reports home oxygen fires caused 15 fatalities between 2013 and 2017 across 16 countries, suggesting significant under-reporting of the issue. By contrast, a white paper report, published by BPR Medical in April 2022, found that 23 deaths from home oxygen fire incidents in France and Italy, had been reported by the media between 2017 and 2021.

In England and Wales, central reporting of adverse incidents is a requirement of the NHS Service Specification for Home Oxygen. After firebreaks became mandatory in 2006, the average number of deaths by fire was 0.36 per thousand patients per year. In the US, where firebreaks were not required, almost twice as many patients (0.62 patients per thousand) died. A Freedom of Information request in 2018 revealed that only one fatality relating to home oxygen fires was recorded in the five-year period between 2013 and 2017.

== Firebreak effectiveness ==
In 2018, a freedom of information request to all clinical commissioning groups in England (where firebreaks are mandatory) revealed that during the five years between 2013 and 2017 inclusive, 63 serious incidents involving oxygen fires were recorded and just one fatality. 73% of CCGs, representing 71% of patients in England, responded to the request. When the results are extrapolated to cover the whole patient population of 81,000, the figures are 89 incidents and 1.4 deaths. The fatality rate is significantly lower than any other previous study in the UK or internationally, and significantly lower than rates in the US or Japan where, compared with the equivalent patient population, they were 27 and 14 respectively. The white paper report suggests that the mandatory introduction of firebreaks, in conjunction with a "multidisciplinary approach to patient education", as well as risk assessments, is responsible for the low level of fatalities.

== Home oxygen fire incidents ==
The International Association of Fire Chiefs monitors reports of home oxygen fires on its live interactive dashboard.

Other major incidents involving deaths and injuries to patients, their relatives, fellow residents, as well as firefighters include:

Fall River, Massachusetts, US. July 13-14, 2025

In July 2025, a major fire in the Gabriel House assisted living facility in Fall River, killed 10 residents and injured more than 30 people, including six firefighters. Preliminary findings trace the point of origin to a single second-floor studio where either a malfunctioning oxygen concentrator or discarded smoking materials ignited in an oxygen-enriched atmosphere. Bristol County District Attorney Thomas M. Quinn III, described the incident as "the greatest loss of life to fire in Massachusetts in more than 40 years”.

North El Paso, Texas, US. July 31, 2025

Three people were hurt and one seriously injured when a house fire erupted at a house in El Paso. An investigation determined the cause of the incident to be "the unintentional ignition of common combustibles due to careless smoking, with a contributing factor being an oxygen-enriched environment from a medical oxygen tank."

Edmonton, Alberta, Canada. May 6, 2025

Over 250 occupants of the Wyndham Crossing apartment complex in North East Edmonton were left homeless after a fire ignited as a result of a person smoking while on oxygen inside one of the suites. Due to wind conditions, the fire turned into an immense blaze, with almost all units expected to have sustained either fire or water damage from the firefighting effort.

Glendale, Arizona, US. December 9, 2024

A fire incident at a two-story apartment building in Glendale, Arizona occurred when a cigarette lit a couch on fire. The flames spread to nearby oxygen tanks, causing an explosion and severely spreading the fire. The apartment unit was destroyed in the incident. No injuries were reported, while twenty adults and four dogs were displaced, and one dog died following the fire.

Houston, Texas, US. February 24, 2024

A grandfather from North West Houston was killed when a fire that was sparked by a lit cigarette while on oxygen ignited the man's head. The man's wife Margaret Brown and their two grandchildren escaped the fire, but all their possessions and savings were lost as a result of the blaze. The fire caused damage to eight apartments in total, with several families having to find a new home.

Hannover, Pennsylvania, US. January 8, 2024

A tragic “careless smoking” fire was caused by a wheelchair-using 79-year-old, who was smoking cigarettes while on oxygen in the garage of a home in Hannover, Pennsylvania. Following an oxygen tank explosion, one occupant of the house received hospital treatment for burns, and another – a 4-year-old child – died from smoke inhalation and thermal burns. Three firefighters received a health evaluation at the hospital after the incident.

Salt Lake City, Utah, US. May 30, 2022

On 30 May 2022, a fatal fire and explosion at a Salt Lake City apartment complex were caused by a resident smoking near an oxygen tank. The incident displaced residents from 13 apartments and resulted in two deaths and multiple injuries. Fire officials confirmed that smoking materials ignited the oxygen, triggering the explosion.

In 2023, former tenants sued the landlord, alleging negligence and failure to act on repeated warnings about the risk. In 2024, a victim's family also filed a lawsuit against a hospice provider, arguing it failed to manage the known dangers associated with oxygen use and smoking.

Collelongo (L'Aquila), Italy. April 15, 2021

78-year-old famous Italian artist Luciano Ventrone died in his house in Collelongo due to an oxygen tank explosion. The man was under oxygen therapy due to respiratory problems, and his attempt to light up a cigarette caused the oxygen tank to explode.

Bradford County, Pennsylvania, US. March 23, 2021

Rober F. Wiglesworth (60-years-old) died after suffering burn injuries that stemmed from smoking a cigarette while being on oxygen. The Lehigh County coroner says that Wiglesworth died after receiving 2nd-degree burns and complications from obstructive pulmonary disease (COPD) one week earlier.

Vancouver, Washington, US. March 9, 2021

Floyd E. Shoop (68-years-old) died following an apartment fire in Vancouver. The fire department responded to the fire, and Shoop was found dead in his bedroom where the fire originated. Officials state that Shoop was a smoker and was on medical oxygen. Another person suffered from smoke inhalation and was hospitalised. Two cats were killed. The fire caused an estimated $203,000 in damage.

Nottingham, Maryland, US. December 3, 2020

75-year-old Michael Richard Praglowski died in a house fire. Crews were called and discovered Praglowski unconscious inside a second floor bedroom. Praglowski later passed away in hospital. Investigators believe the fire was accidental and was caused when Praglowski was smoking while hooked up to an oxygen tank.

Wellington, Kansas, US. September 22, 2020

Bernardine Crittenden (85-years-old) died in a house fire in Wellington caused by her smoking a cigarette while being on oxygen. The fire caused roughly $50,000 in damage. By the time firefighters arrived, the fire had "burned itself out after causing considerable fire damage to the living room". The woman was found dead.

Giromagny, France. March 8, 2020

An 87-year-old woman was severely injured in a fire that occurred at a care-home in Giromagny. The woman attempted to light a cigarette up while being on oxygen, which resulted in big flames burning her severely on the face and hands. She was rushed to hospital. This incident occurred under a week after an appointment with an oxygen-safety company was cancelled, raising concerns amongst family members of residents.

Saint-Nazaire, France. January 12, 2020

A 68-year-old woman died in a house fire in Saint-Nazaire, after she attempted to light a cigarette up while being on oxygen.

Richmond, Indiana, US. November 19, 2018

Two people were killed and six injured in an apartment complex fire, 48 year old Andrew Thornburg and 56 year old Richard Wilkinson. A number of senior citizens live in the apartments many of whom use walkers and wheelchairs making the task of evacuating the residents harder for fire crews. The fire is believed to have been caused by 'smoking materials', with many of the residents understood to be home oxygen users."

Tilford, South Dakota, US. September 7, 2018

43 year-old firefighter David Fischer was killed when a propane tank exploded during a fire. Home oxygen patient Raymond Joseph Bachmeier (82) was also killed in the incident. Authorities said that the fire was caused by "a cigarette being smoked in bed while on oxygen."

Fayetteville, Arkansas, US. July 14, 2018

An explosion at a house left a 69-year-old man dead. The man's daughter reported that he had been smoking near his oxygen concentrator.

Marion County, Indianapolis, US. May 19, 2018

A man died in a fire which is believed to have started after he was smoking near an oxygen cylinder.

Rathcobican, County Offaly, Ireland. June 22, 2017

54-year-old Caroline Murphy died as a result of health complications from burns suffered in her home when her home oxygen equipment caught fire while she was using an e-cigarette.

San Remo, Italy. March 23, 2017

A woman died in a fire which started while she was smoking and simultaneously using her oxygen cylinder. Her husband also died trying to escape the blaze.

Pont-Sainte-Maxence, Oise, France. March 11, 2017

A 60-year-old wheelchair-using patient, described as a 'big smoker', died when his liquid oxygen dewar exploded following a nighttime fire in his apartment. His wife also suffered injuries.

Pau, France. February 19, 2017

A patient died and an apartment was destroyed after medical oxygen cylinders exploded, leading to a fire. Fifteen other residents had to be relocated after the incident.

Winchester, Kentucky, US. March 11, 2016

Patient Jackie Hisle Jr. was sentenced to ten years' imprisonment on three counts of manslaughter after an incident in which his son, Donald Hisle, and two other residents were killed and six others were injured. Mr Hisle Jr. was smoking while using an oxygen concentrator, despite warnings.

Knox County, Tennessee, US. February, 2012

A jury awarded $2.5 million in damages against Apria Healthcare after the death of 72-year-old Jimmy Kelley from Knox County. The award was reduced to $1.275 million after the jury found Kelley to be partly responsible. Mr Kelley, a smoker, also used a space heater in a camper van where oxygen cylinders were stored.

== Regulation ==
=== United States ===
Before placing a new concentrator on the market, all oxygen concentrator manufacturers need to make a 510(k) premarket submission to the US Food and Drug Administration (FDA).

If the manufacturer chose to apply ISO 80601-2-69:2020 to demonstrate the safety of the new device, the fire safety elements of the standard, including 'a means to extinguish a tubing fire and isolate the oxygen flow' are a requirement. Approval to market the product would then be based upon compliance to the standard.

In March, 2018, the US Veterans Health Administration issued a Patient Safety Alert mandating the use of thermal fuses in all its patients' home oxygen installations, unless there is a clinical reason for not doing so. The Patient Safety Alert applies to all patients, not just those deemed to be at 'high risk'. It requires two thermal fuses to be fitted per patient installation, and any unidirectional thermal fuses must be replaced with bidirectional versions at the next scheduled visit (unless the unidirectional thermal fuse is designed so it cannot be fitted in the wrong direction).

In January 2020, in coordination with Fire Departments around the state and other agencies, the Wyoming State Fire Marshals Office launched the statewide community risk 307 CRR initiative. This aims to "to reach users of home medical oxygen, place safety devices on their units, and provide a home-risk checkup for the residents when possible". The initiative follows Wyoming fire data which revealed that more than fifty percent of the deaths in residential structure fires throughout the state have been in homes with medical oxygen. The goal of the initiative is to reduce fire deaths and injuries by 2024 by installing inline oxygen firebreaks in 100% of home using medical oxygen across the State.

In March 2022, the American Burn Association (ABA) agreed a position statement on home oxygen burn prevention supporting the use of bidirectional thermal fuses in oxygen tubing.

In July 2022, the International Association of Fire Chiefs (IAFC) adopted a position statement on home oxygen fire safety that recommended the use of firebreaks.

In November 2023, Iowa became the first US State to fund bidirectional thermal fuses through the Iowa Medicaid system.

Washington State, North Dakota, South Dakota, Kansas, and Ohio Health & Human Services Departments have also confirmed that they will cover thermal fuses via state Medicaid. In January 2025, the state of Missouri MO HealthNet Division (MHD) introduced a requirement that oxygen providers must supply bidirectional thermal fuses. MHD also increased its oxygen reimbursement rates for DMEs.

In January 2025, the Centers for Medicare and Medicaid Services (CMS) confirmed its decision to not create a unique code (HCPCS code) for the reimbursement for thermal fuses. It followed a preliminary recommendation in October 2024 that a unique HCPCS code for thermal fuses is not necessary because the agency considers these items to be part of suppliers’ overhead associated with providing home oxygen equipment.

The International Association of Fire Chiefs (IAFC) confirmed that it would continue to pursue a second application to the CMS for a unique code, claiming that the current reimbursement framework was insufficient.

==== Underreporting of incidents in the United States ====
Evidence suggests that incidents are underreported in state and national datasets. A retrospective, multi-source analysis of statewide data (2020-2023) from death certificates, hospital admissions, registries, and fire incident reports found that home oxygen therapy deaths are underreported by a factor of twenty in state fire incident data.

=== Europe ===
In the European Union the fitting of firebreaks is a legal requirement for all home oxygen installations.

All economic operators in the EU, including home oxygen service providers, must comply with the Medical Device Directive (93/42/EEC) or the Medical Device Regulation (2017/745).

The instructions for use for an oxygen concentrator placed on the EU single market must include an instruction to the effect that a firebreak shall be fitted close to the patient to stop the flow of oxygen in the event of a fire. By including this statement the oxygen concentrator manufacturer is complying with the harmonised EN ISO type standard for oxygen concentrators EN ISO 8359:2009+A1:2012, which provides the manufacturer with an immediate presumption of conformity to the Essential Requirements of the Medical Devices Directive and allows them to properly apply the CE mark. Since January 2015 all instructions for use provided with oxygen concentrators placed on the European market will include this statement.

The applied CE mark is reliant on the home oxygen service provider following this instruction and fitting a firebreak. If the firebreak is not fitted, then the Essential Requirements for performance and safety are not met and the CE mark is no longer valid. It also means that the home oxygen service provider's status, within the framework under which the single market for medical devices operates, changes from 'distributor' to 'manufacturer'. This has significant regulatory implications.

The EU Medical Devices Directive also requires that economic operators adopt solutions that 'reduce risk as far as possible' in line with the 'state of the art'. The fitting of firebreaks is therefore a requirement irrespective of the oxygen source, including oxygen concentrators, liquid oxygen dewars or gas cylinders.

==== Underreporting of home oxygen fire incidents in Europe ====
Statistics from the European Industrial Gases Association (EIGA) suggest that home oxygen fires caused 15 deaths between 2013 and 2017 in 16 EU countries. However media analysis across another five-year period (2017–2021), published in a white paper by BPR Medical, identified 23 deaths in France and Italy alone.

The report calls for Competent Authorities in Europe to address home oxygen fire reporting procedures and the implementation of existing patient safety regulations.

=== United Kingdom ===
An additional legal requirement applies in the UK, where the fitting of firebreaks has been mandatory under the service specification of the home oxygen service since 2006.

=== Germany ===
In 2011, the German Federal Institute for Drugs and Medical Devices recommended 'corrective actions to prevent fires in oxygen concentrators'. It issued a notice stating that from July 1, 2012, all devices should be equipped with installations for stopping encroachment of the fire into the device, and interruption of the delivery of oxygen in the accessory as close to the patient as possible, in case of ignition. Manufacturers were also required to offer retrospective refitting for devices placed on the market before July 1, 2012.

== World Health Organization guidance ==
The World Health Organization recommends 'firebreak connectors to stop the oxygen flow in the event of fire' in all oxygen concentrators.

== Oxygen firebreak standards ==
Three main standards cover the use of oxygen firebreaks / thermal fuses:

- ISO 8359:1996/Amd.1:2012: Oxygen concentrators for medical use. Safety requirements

The safety requirements for oxygen concentrators are governed by the amended standard ISO 8359:1996+A1:2012. The US FDA recognized the standard from January 2014. In January 2015, it was superseded by ISO 80601-2-69:2014. Health Canada, which is responsible for national public health, still recognizes the standard.

- EN ISO 8359:2009+A1:2012: Oxygen concentrators for medical use. Safety requirements

All of the 28 CEN (European Committee for Standardization) national standardization bodies (NSBs) have published EN ISO 8359:2009+A1:2012 as national standards. In Europe EN ISO 8359:2009+A1:2012 has harmonized standard status, which triggers 'presumption of conformity'.

- ISO 80601-2-69:2014: Medical electrical equipment – Part 2-69: Particular requirements for basic safety and essential performance of oxygen concentrator equipment

Included in ISO 80601-2-69:2014 are specific requirements that serve to mitigate the risk of fire related to oxygen therapy. The requirements state that the following should be provided:

1. A means to extinguish a tubing fire and isolate the oxygen flow in the accessories (nasal cannula and tubing or mask and tubing). The standard states that this should be fitted close to the patient.
2. A means to prevent the fire spreading into the oxygen concentrator outlet. The standard states that the means can also stop the flow of oxygen although it is not required to do so. It also specifies that if a bubble humidifier is fitted to the concentrator, that the means must also protect the bubble humidifier.
