= Oxygen toxicity =

Toxic effects of breathing oxygen at high partial pressures

- Other names: Oxygen toxicity syndrome, oxygen intoxication, oxygen poisoning
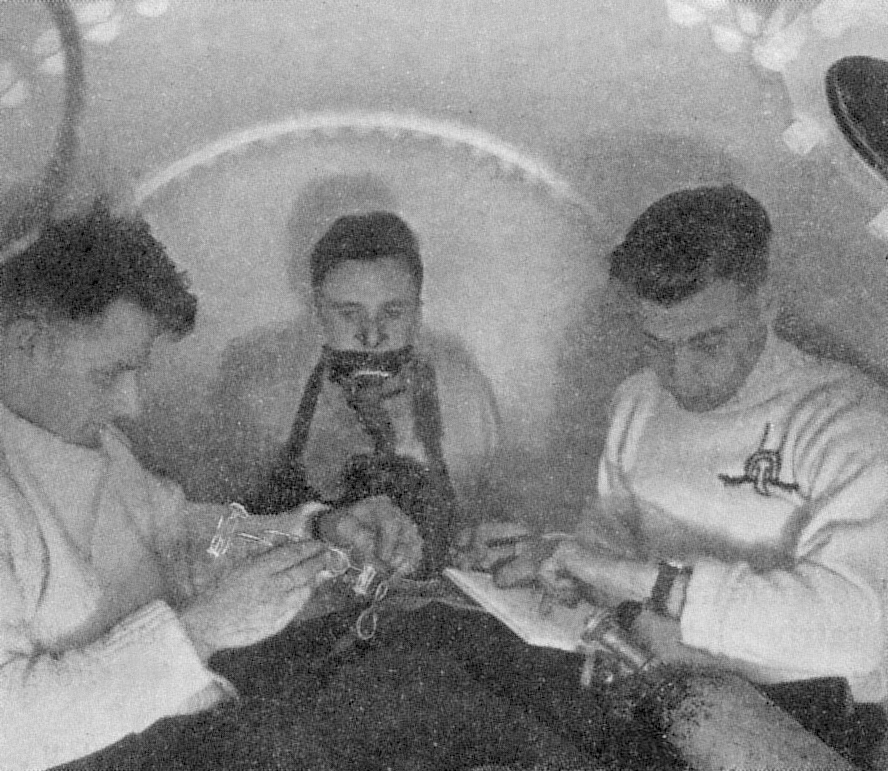
- In 1942–1943 the UK Government carried out extensive testing for oxygen toxicity in divers. The chamber is pressurised with air to 3.7 bar. The subject in the centre is breathing 100% oxygen from a mask.
- Specialty: Diving medicine, hyperbaric medicine, neonatal medicine

Oxygen toxicity is a condition resulting from the harmful effects of breathing molecular oxygen (O_{2}) at increased partial pressures. Severe cases can result in cell damage and death, with effects most often seen in the central nervous system, lungs, and eyes. Historically, the central nervous system condition was called the Paul Bert effect, and the pulmonary condition the Lorrain Smith effect, after the researchers who pioneered the discoveries and descriptions in the late 19th century. Oxygen toxicity is a concern for underwater divers, those on high concentrations of supplemental oxygen, and those undergoing hyperbaric oxygen therapy.

The result of breathing increased partial pressures of oxygen is hyperoxia, an excess of oxygen in body tissues. The body is affected in different ways depending on the type of exposure. Central nervous system toxicity is caused by short exposure to high partial pressures of oxygen at greater than atmospheric pressure. Pulmonary and ocular toxicity result from longer exposure to increased oxygen levels at normal pressure. Symptoms may include disorientation, breathing problems, and vision changes such as myopia. Prolonged exposure to above-normal oxygen partial pressures, or shorter exposures to very high partial pressures, can cause oxidative damage to cell membranes, collapse of the alveoli in the lungs, retinal detachment, and seizures. Oxygen toxicity is managed by reducing the exposure to increased oxygen levels. Studies show that, in the long term, a robust recovery from most types of oxygen toxicity is possible.

Protocols for avoidance of the effects of hyperoxia exist in fields where oxygen is breathed at higher-than-normal partial pressures, including underwater diving using compressed breathing gases, hyperbaric medicine, neonatal care and human spaceflight. These protocols have resulted in the increasing rarity of seizures due to oxygen toxicity, with pulmonary and ocular damage being largely confined to the problems of managing premature infants.

In recent years, oxygen has become available for recreational use in oxygen bars. The US Food and Drug Administration has warned those who have conditions such as heart or lung disease not to use oxygen bars. Scuba divers use breathing gases containing up to 100% oxygen, and should have specific training in using such gases.

== Classification ==
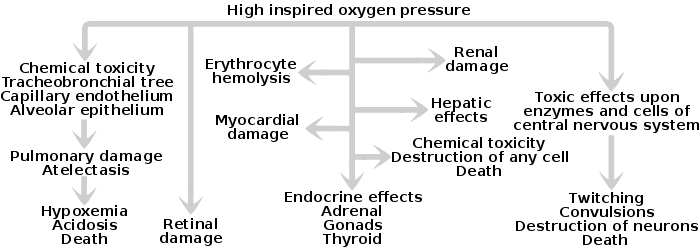
Breathing air with high oxygen pressure can lead to several adverse effects.

The effects of oxygen toxicity may be classified by the organs affected, producing three principal forms:

- Central nervous system, characterised by convulsions followed by unconsciousness, occurring under hyperbaric conditions;
- Pulmonary (lungs), characterised by difficulty in breathing and pain within the chest, occurring when breathing increased pressures of oxygen for extended periods;
- Ocular (retinopathic conditions), characterised by alterations to the eyes, occurring when breathing increased pressures of oxygen for extended periods.

Central nervous system oxygen toxicity can cause seizures, brief periods of rigidity followed by convulsions and unconsciousness, and is of concern to divers who encounter greater than atmospheric pressures. Pulmonary oxygen toxicity results in damage to the lungs, causing pain and difficulty in breathing. Oxidative damage to the eye may lead to myopia or partial detachment of the retina. Pulmonary and ocular damage are most likely to occur when supplemental oxygen is administered as part of a treatment, particularly to newborn infants, but are also a concern during hyperbaric oxygen therapy.

Oxidative damage may occur in any cell in the body but the effects on the three most susceptible organs will be the primary concern. It may also be implicated in damage to red blood cells (haemolysis), the liver, heart, endocrine glands (adrenal glands, gonads, and thyroid), or kidneys, and general damage to cells.

In unusual circumstances, effects on other tissues may be observed: it is suspected that during spaceflight, high oxygen concentrations may contribute to bone damage. Hyperoxia can also indirectly cause carbon dioxide narcosis in patients with lung ailments such as chronic obstructive pulmonary disease or with central respiratory depression. Hyperventilation of atmospheric air at atmospheric pressures does not cause oxygen toxicity, because sea-level air has a partial pressure of oxygen of 0.21 bar (21 kPa) whereas toxicity does not occur below 0.3 bar (30 kPa).

== Signs and symptoms ==
Oxygen poisoning at 90 feet (27 m) in the dry in 36 subjects in order of performance
Exposure (mins.)	Num. of subjects	Symptoms
96	1	Prolonged dazzle; severe spasmodic vomiting
60–69	3	Severe lip-twitching; euphoria; nausea and vertigo; arm twitch
50–55	4	Severe lip-twitching; dazzle; blubbering of lips; fell asleep; dazed
31–35	4	Nausea, vertigo, lip-twitching; convulsed
21–30	6	Convulsed; drowsiness; severe lip-twitching; epigastric aura; twitch L arm; amnesia
16–20	8	Convulsed; vertigo and severe lip twitching; epigastric aura; spasmodic respiration;
11–15	4	Inspiratory predominance; lip-twitching and syncope; nausea and confusion
6–10	6	Dazed and lip-twitching; paraesthesiae; vertigo; "Diaphragmatic spasm"; severe nausea

=== Central nervous system ===
Central nervous system oxygen toxicity manifests as symptoms such as visual changes (especially tunnel vision), ringing in the ears (tinnitus), nausea, twitching (especially of the face), behavioural changes (irritability, anxiety, confusion), and dizziness. This may be followed by a tonic–clonic seizure consisting of two phases: intense muscle contraction occurs for several seconds (tonic phase); followed by rapid spasms of alternate muscle relaxation and contraction producing convulsive jerking (clonic phase). The seizure ends with a period of unconsciousness (the postictal state). The onset of seizure depends upon the partial pressure of oxygen in the breathing gas and exposure duration. However, exposure time before onset is unpredictable, as tests have shown a wide variation, both amongst individuals, and in the same individual from day to day. In addition, many external factors, such as underwater immersion, exposure to cold, and exercise will decrease the time to onset of central nervous system symptoms. Decrease of tolerance is closely linked to retention of carbon dioxide. Other factors, such as darkness and caffeine, increase tolerance in test animals, but these effects have not been proven in humans.

=== Lungs ===
Exposure to oxygen pressures greater than 0.5 bar (7.3 psi), such as during diving, oxygen prebreathing prior to flight, or hyperbaric therapy is associated with the onset of pulmonary toxicity symptoms, also referred to as chronic oxygen toxicity. Pulmonary toxicity symptoms result from an inflammation that starts in the airways leading to the lungs and then spreads into the lungs (tracheobronchial tree). The symptoms appear in the upper chest region (substernal and carinal regions). This begins as a mild tickle on inhalation and progresses to frequent coughing. If breathing increased partial pressures of oxygen continues, subjects experience a mild burning on inhalation along with uncontrollable coughing and occasional shortness of breath (dyspnea). Physical findings related to pulmonary toxicity have included bubbling sounds heard through a stethoscope (bubbling rales), fever, and increased blood flow to the lining of the nose (hyperaemia of the nasal mucosa). Initially, there is an exudative phase that results in pulmonary edema. An increase in the width of the interstitial space may be seen in histological examination. X-rays of the lungs show little change in the short term, but extended exposure leads to increasing diffuse shadowing throughout both lungs. Pulmonary function measurements are reduced, as indicated by a reduction in the amount of air that the lungs can hold (vital capacity) and changes in expiratory function and lung elasticity. Lung diffusing capacity decreases leading eventually to hypoxaemia.

Tests in animals have indicated a variation in tolerance similar to that found in central nervous system toxicity, as well as significant variations between species. When the exposure to oxygen above 0.5 bar (50 kPa) is intermittent, it permits the lungs to recover and delays the onset of toxicity. A similar progression is common to all mammalian species. If death from hypoxaemia has not occurred after exposure for several days a proliferative phase occurs, developing a chronic thickening of the alveolar membrane and a decrement in lung diffusing capacity. These changes are mostly reversible on return to normoxia, but the time required for complete recovery is not known.

=== Eyes ===
In premature babies, signs of damage to the eye (retinopathy of prematurity, or ROP) are observed via an ophthalmoscope as a demarcation between the vascularised and non-vascularised regions of an infant's retina. The degree of this demarcation is used to designate four stages: (I) the demarcation is a line; (II) the demarcation becomes a ridge; (III) growth of new blood vessels occurs around the ridge; (IV) the retina begins to detach from the inner wall of the eye (choroid).

== Causes ==
Oxygen toxicity is caused by hyperoxia, exposure to oxygen at partial pressures greater than those to which the body is normally exposed. This occurs in three principal settings: underwater diving, hyperbaric oxygen therapy, and the provision of supplemental oxygen, in critical care, and for long-term treatment of chronic disorders, and particularly to premature infants. In each case, the risk factors are markedly different.

Under normal or reduced ambient pressures, the effects of hyperoxia are initially restricted to the lungs, which are directly exposed, but after prolonged exposure or at hyperbaric pressures, other organs can be at risk. At normal partial pressures of inhaled oxygen, most of the oxygen transported in the blood is carried by haemoglobin, but the amount of dissolved oxygen will increase at partial pressures of arterial oxygen exceeding 100 millimetres of mercury (0.13 bar), when oxyhemoglobin saturation is nearly complete. At higher concentrations the effects of hyperoxia are more widespread in the body tissues beyond the lungs.

=== Central nervous system toxicity ===
Exposures, from minutes to a few hours, to partial pressures of oxygen above about 1.6 bars (160 kPa)—about eight times normal atmospheric partial pressure—are usually associated with central nervous system oxygen toxicity, also known as acute oxygen toxicity, and are most likely to occur among patients undergoing hyperbaric oxygen therapy and divers. Since sea level atmospheric pressure is about 1 bar (100 kPa), central nervous system toxicity can only occur under hyperbaric conditions, where ambient pressure is above normal. Divers breathing air at depths beyond 60 m (200 ft) face an increasing risk of an oxygen toxicity "hit" (seizure). Divers breathing a gas mixture enriched with oxygen, such as nitrox, similarly increase the risk of a seizure at shallower depths, should they descend below the maximum operating depth accepted for the mixture. CNS toxicity is aggravated by a high partial pressure of carbon dioxide, stress, fatigue, and cold, all of which are much more likely in diving than in hyperbaric therapy.

=== Lung toxicity ===
The curves show typical decrement in lung vital capacity when breathing oxygen. Lambertsen concluded in 1987 that 0.5 bar (50 kPa) could be tolerated indefinitely.

The lungs and the remainder of the respiratory tract are exposed to the highest concentration of oxygen in the human body and are therefore the first organs to show chronic toxicity. Pulmonary toxicity occurs only with exposure to partial pressures of oxygen greater than 0.5 bar (50 kPa), corresponding to an oxygen fraction of 50% at normal atmospheric pressure. The earliest signs of pulmonary toxicity begin with evidence of tracheobronchitis, or inflammation of the upper airways, after an asymptomatic period between 4 and 22 hours at greater than 95% oxygen, with some studies suggesting symptoms usually begin after approximately 14 hours at this level of oxygen.

At partial pressures of oxygen of 2 to 3 bar (200 to 300 kPa)—100% oxygen at 2 to 3 times atmospheric pressure—these symptoms may begin as early as 3 hours into exposure to oxygen. Experiments on rats breathing oxygen at pressures between 1 and 3 bars (100 and 300 kPa) suggest that pulmonary manifestations of oxygen toxicity may not be the same for normobaric conditions as they are for hyperbaric conditions. Evidence of decline in lung function as measured by pulmonary function testing can occur as quickly as 24 hours of continuous exposure to 100% oxygen, with evidence of diffuse alveolar damage and the onset of acute respiratory distress syndrome usually occurring after 48 hours on 100% oxygen. Breathing 100% oxygen also eventually leads to collapse of the alveoli (atelectasis), while—at the same partial pressure of oxygen—the presence of significant partial pressures of inert gases, typically nitrogen, will prevent this effect.

Preterm newborns are known to be at higher risk for bronchopulmonary dysplasia with extended exposure to high concentrations of oxygen. Other groups at higher risk for oxygen toxicity are patients on mechanical ventilation with exposure to levels of oxygen greater than 50%, and patients exposed to chemicals that increase risk for oxygen toxicity such the chemotherapeutic agent bleomycin. Therefore, current guidelines for patients on mechanical ventilation in intensive care recommend keeping oxygen concentration less than 60%. Likewise, divers who undergo treatment of decompression sickness are at increased risk of oxygen toxicity as treatment entails exposure to long periods of oxygen breathing under hyperbaric conditions, in addition to any oxygen exposure during the dive.

=== Ocular toxicity ===
Prolonged exposure to high inspired fractions of oxygen causes damage to the retina. Damage to the developing eye of infants exposed to high oxygen fraction at normal pressure has a different mechanism and effect from the eye damage experienced by adult divers under hyperbaric conditions. Hyperoxia may be a contributing factor for the disorder called retrolental fibroplasia or retinopathy of prematurity (ROP) in infants. In preterm infants, the retina is often not fully vascularised. Retinopathy of prematurity occurs when the development of the retinal vasculature is arrested and then proceeds abnormally. Associated with the growth of these new vessels is fibrous tissue (scar tissue) that may contract to cause retinal detachment. Supplemental oxygen exposure, while a risk factor, is not the main risk factor for development of this disease. Restricting supplemental oxygen use does not necessarily reduce the rate of retinopathy of prematurity, and may raise the risk of hypoxia-related systemic complications.

Hyperoxic myopia has occurred in closed circuit oxygen rebreather divers with prolonged exposures. It also occurs frequently in those undergoing repeated hyperbaric oxygen therapy. This is due to an increase in the refractive power of the lens, since axial length and keratometry readings do not reveal a corneal or length basis for a myopic shift. It is usually reversible with time.

A possible side effect of hyperbaric oxygen therapy is the initial or further development of cataracts, which are an increase in opacity of the lens of the eye which reduces visual acuity, and can eventually result in blindness. This is a rare event, associated with lifetime exposure to raised oxygen concentration, and may be under-reported as it develops very slowly, and cataracts are a common disorder of advanced age. The cause is not fully understood, but evidence suggests that raised oxygen levels at the lens may be caused by deterioration of the vitreous humour due to age, and this causes degradation of lens crystallins by cross-linking, forming aggregates capable of scattering light. This may be an end-state development of the more commonly observed myopic shift associated with hyperbaric treatment.

== Mechanism ==
The lipid peroxidation mechanism shows a single radical initiating a chain reaction which converts unsaturated lipids to lipid peroxides.

The biochemical basis for the toxicity of oxygen is the partial reduction of oxygen by one or two electrons to form reactive oxygen species, which are natural by-products of the normal metabolism of oxygen and have important roles in cell signalling. One species produced by the body, the superoxide anion (O^{−}_{2}), is possibly involved in iron acquisition. Higher than normal concentrations of oxygen lead to increased levels of reactive oxygen species. Oxygen is necessary for cell metabolism, and the blood supplies it to all parts of the body. When oxygen is breathed at high partial pressures, a hyperoxic condition will rapidly spread, with the most vascularised tissues being most vulnerable. During times of environmental stress, levels of reactive oxygen species can increase dramatically, which can damage cell structures and produce oxidative stress.

While all the reaction mechanisms of these species within the body are not yet fully understood, one of the most reactive products of oxidative stress is the hydroxyl radical (·OH), which can initiate a damaging chain reaction of lipid peroxidation in the unsaturated lipids within cell membranes. High concentrations of oxygen also increase the formation of other free radicals, such as nitric oxide, peroxynitrite, and trioxidane, which harm DNA and other biomolecules. Although the body has many antioxidant systems such as glutathione that guard against oxidative stress, these systems are eventually overwhelmed at very high concentrations of free oxygen, and the rate of cell damage exceeds the capacity of the systems that prevent or repair it. Cell damage and cell death then result.

== Diagnosis ==
Diagnosis of central nervous system oxygen toxicity in divers prior to seizure is difficult as the symptoms of visual disturbance, ear problems, dizziness, confusion and nausea can be due to many factors common to the underwater environment such as narcosis, congestion and coldness. However, these symptoms may be helpful in diagnosing the first stages of oxygen toxicity in patients undergoing hyperbaric oxygen therapy. In either case, unless there is a prior history of epilepsy or tests indicate hypoglycaemia, a seizure occurring in the setting of breathing oxygen at partial pressures greater than 1.4 bar (140 kPa) suggests a diagnosis of oxygen toxicity.

Diagnosis of bronchopulmonary dysplasia in newborn infants with breathing difficulties is difficult in the first few weeks. However, if the infant's breathing does not improve during this time, blood tests and x-rays may be used to confirm bronchopulmonary dysplasia. In addition, an echocardiogram can help to eliminate other possible causes such as congenital heart defects or pulmonary arterial hypertension.

The diagnosis of retinopathy of prematurity in infants is typically suggested by the clinical setting. Prematurity, low birth weight, and a history of oxygen exposure are the principal indicators, while no hereditary factors have been shown to yield a pattern.

=== Differential diagnosis ===
Clinical diagnosis can be confirmed with arterial oxygen levels. A number of other conditions can be confused with oxygen toxicity, these include:

- Carbon monoxide poisoning
- Cerebrovascular event (stroke)
- Envenomation or toxin ingestion
- Hypercapnia (Carbon dioxide narcosis)
- Hyperventilation
- Hypoglycemia
- Infection
- Migraine
- Multiple sclerosis
- Seizure disorder (epilepsy)

== Prevention ==
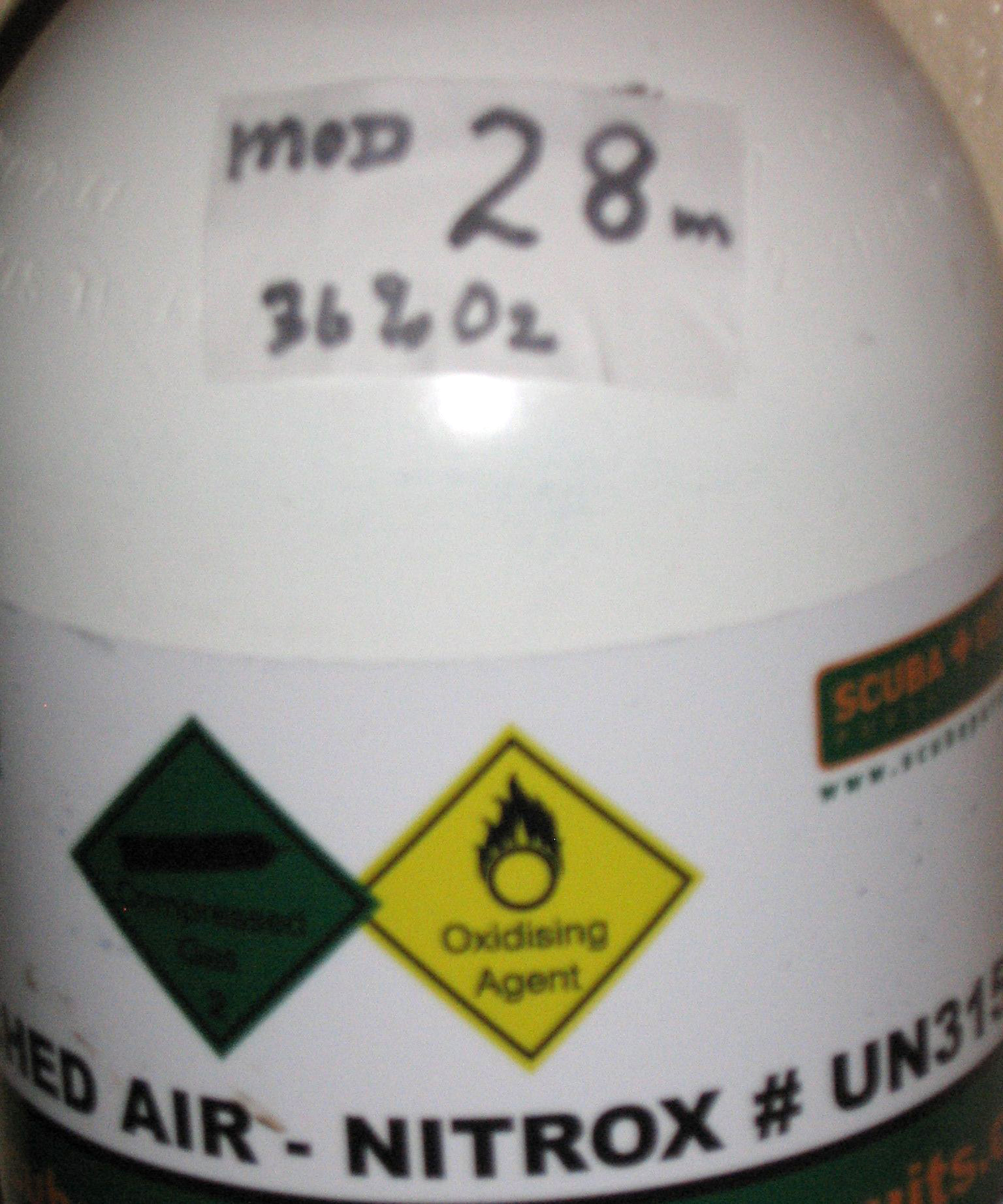
The label on the diving cylinder shows that it contains oxygen-rich gas (36%) and is boldly marked with a maximum operating depth of 28 metres (92 ft)

The prevention of oxygen toxicity depends entirely on the setting. Both underwater and in space, proper precautions can eliminate the most pernicious effects. Premature infants commonly require supplemental oxygen to treat complications of preterm birth. In this case prevention of bronchopulmonary dysplasia and retinopathy of prematurity must be carried out without compromising a supply of oxygen adequate to preserve the infant's life.

=== Underwater ===
Oxygen toxicity is a catastrophic hazard in scuba diving, because a seizure results in high risk of death by drowning. The seizure may occur suddenly and with no warning symptoms. The effects are sudden convulsions and unconsciousness, during which victims can lose their regulator and drown. One of the advantages of a full-face diving mask is prevention of regulator loss in the event of a seizure. Mouthpiece retaining straps are a relatively inexpensive alternative with a similar but less effective function. As there is an increased risk of central nervous system oxygen toxicity on deep dives, long dives and dives where oxygen-rich breathing gases are used, divers are taught to calculate a maximum operating depth for oxygen-rich breathing gases, and cylinders containing such mixtures should be clearly marked with that depth.

The risk of seizure appears to be a function of dose – a cumulative combination of partial pressure and duration. The threshold for oxygen partial pressure below which seizures never occur has not been established, and may depend on many variables, some of them personal. The risk to a specific person can vary considerably depending on individual sensitivity, level of exercise, and carbon dioxide retention, which is influenced by work of breathing.

In some diver training courses for modes of diving in which exposure may reach levels with significant risk, divers are taught to plan and monitor what is called the 'oxygen clock' of their dives. This is a notional alarm clock, which ticks more quickly at increased oxygen pressure and is set to activate at the maximum single exposure limit recommended in the National Oceanic and Atmospheric Administration Diving Manual. For the following partial pressures of oxygen the limits are: 45 minutes at 1.6 bar (160 kPa), 120 minutes at 1.5 bar (150 kPa), 150 minutes at 1.4 bar (140 kPa), 180 minutes at 1.3 bar (130 kPa) and 210 minutes at 1.2 bar (120 kPa), but it is impossible to predict with any reliability whether or when toxicity symptoms will occur. Many nitrox-capable dive computers calculate an oxygen loading and can track it across multiple dives. The aim is to avoid activating the alarm by reducing the partial pressure of oxygen in the breathing gas or by reducing the time spent breathing gas of greater oxygen partial pressure. As the partial pressure of oxygen increases with the fraction of oxygen in the breathing gas and the depth of the dive, the diver obtains more time on the oxygen clock by diving at a shallower depth, by breathing a less oxygen-rich gas, or by shortening the duration of exposure to oxygen-rich gases. This function is provided by some technical diving decompression computers and rebreather control and monitoring hardware.

Diving below 56 m (184 ft) on air would expose a diver to increasing danger of oxygen toxicity as the partial pressure of oxygen exceeds 1.4 bar (140 kPa), so a gas mixture should be used which contains less than 21% oxygen (termed a hypoxic mixture). Increasing the proportion of nitrogen is not viable, since it would produce a strongly narcotic mixture. However, helium is not narcotic, and a usable mixture may be blended either by completely replacing nitrogen with helium (the resulting mix is called heliox), or by replacing part of the nitrogen with helium, producing a trimix.

Pulmonary oxygen toxicity is an entirely avoidable event while diving. The limited duration and naturally intermittent nature of most diving makes this a relatively rare (and even then, reversible) complication for divers. Established guidelines enable divers to calculate when they are at risk of pulmonary toxicity. In saturation diving it can be avoided by limiting the oxygen content of gas in living areas to below 0.4 bar.

==== Screening ====
The intention of screening using an oxygen tolerance test is to identify divers with low tolerance to high partial pressures of hyperbaric oxygen who may be more prone to oxygen convulsions during diving operations or during hyperbaric treatment for decompression sickness. The value of this test has been questioned, and statistical studies have shown low incidence of seizures during standard hyperbaric treatment schedules, so some navies have discontinued its use, though an others continue to require the test for all candidate divers.

The variability in tolerance and other variable factors such as workload have resulted in the U.S. Navy abandoning screening for oxygen tolerance. Of the 6,250 oxygen-tolerance tests performed between 1976 and 1997, only 6 episodes of oxygen toxicity were observed (0.1%).

The oxygen tolerance test used by the Indian Navy, which follows recommendations of the US Navy and US National Oceanic and Atmospheric Administration, is to breathe 100% oxygen delivered by BIBS mask at an ambient pressure of 2.8 bar absolute (18 msw) for 30 minutes, at rest in a dry hyperbaric chamber. No symptoms of CNS oxygen toxicity may be observed by the attendant.

=== Hyperbaric setting ===
The presence of a fever or a history of seizure is a relative contraindication to hyperbaric oxygen treatment. The schedules used for treatment of decompression illness allow for periods of breathing air rather than 100% oxygen (air breaks) to reduce the chance of seizure or lung damage. The U.S. Navy uses treatment tables based on periods alternating between 100% oxygen and air. For example, USN table 6 requires 75 minutes (three periods of 20 minutes oxygen/5 minutes air) at an ambient pressure of 2.8 standard atmospheres (280 kPa), equivalent to a depth of 18 metres (60 ft). This is followed by a slow reduction in pressure to 1.9 atm (190 kPa) over 30 minutes on oxygen. The patient then remains at that pressure for a further 150 minutes, consisting of two periods of 15 minutes air/60 minutes oxygen, before the pressure is reduced to atmospheric over 30 minutes on oxygen.

Vitamin E and selenium were proposed and later rejected as a potential method of protection against pulmonary oxygen toxicity. There is however some experimental evidence in rats that vitamin E and selenium aid in preventing in vivo lipid peroxidation and free radical damage, and therefore prevent retinal changes following repetitive hyperbaric oxygen exposures.

=== Normobaric setting ===
Bronchopulmonary dysplasia is reversible in the early stages by use of break periods on lower pressures of oxygen, but it may eventually result in irreversible lung injury if allowed to progress to severe damage. One or two days of exposure without oxygen breaks are needed to cause such damage.

Retinopathy of prematurity is largely preventable by screening. Current guidelines require that all babies of less than 32 weeks gestational age or having a birth weight less than 1.5 kg (3.3 lb) should be screened for retinopathy of prematurity at least every two weeks. The National Cooperative Study in 1954 showed a causal link between supplemental oxygen and retinopathy of prematurity, but subsequent curtailment of supplemental oxygen caused an increase in infant mortality. To balance the risks of hypoxia and retinopathy of prematurity, modern protocols now require monitoring of blood oxygen levels in premature infants receiving oxygen.

Careful titration of dosage to minimise delivered concentration while achieving the desired level of oxygenation will both minimise the risk of oxygen toxicity damage and the amount of oxygen used for long term therapy. A typical target for oxygen saturation when receiving oxygen therapy, would be in the range of 91-95%, in both term and preterm infants.

=== Hypobaric setting ===
In low-pressure environments oxygen toxicity may be avoided since the toxicity is caused by high partial pressure of oxygen, not by high oxygen fraction. This is illustrated by the use of pure oxygen in spacesuits, which must operate at low pressure, and a high oxygen fraction and cabin pressure lower than normal atmospheric pressure in early spacecraft, for example, the Gemini and Apollo spacecraft. In such applications as extra-vehicular activity, high-fraction oxygen is non-toxic, even at breathing mixture fractions approaching 100%, because the oxygen partial pressure is not allowed to chronically exceed 0.3 bar (4.4 psi).

== Management ==
The retina (red) is detached at the top of the eye.

The silicone band (scleral buckle, blue) is placed around the eye. This brings the wall of the eye into contact with the detached retina, allowing the retina to re-attach.

During hyperbaric oxygen therapy, the patient will usually breathe 100% oxygen from a mask while inside a hyperbaric chamber pressurised with air to about 2.8 bar (280 kPa). Seizures during the therapy are managed by removing the mask from the patient, thereby dropping the partial pressure of oxygen inspired below 0.6 bar (60 kPa).

A seizure underwater requires that the diver be brought to the surface as soon as practicable. Although for many years the recommendation has been not to raise the diver during the seizure itself, owing to the danger of arterial gas embolism (AGE), there is some evidence that the glottis does not fully obstruct the airway. This has led to the current recommendation by the Diving Committee of the Undersea and Hyperbaric Medical Society that a diver should be raised during the seizure's clonic (convulsive) phase if the regulator is not in the diver's mouth—as the danger of drowning is then greater than that of AGE—but the ascent should be delayed until the end of the clonic phase otherwise. Rescuers ensure that their own safety is not compromised during the convulsive phase. They then ensure that where the victim's air supply is established it is maintained, and carry out a controlled buoyant lift. Lifting an unconscious body is taught by most recreational diver training agencies as an advanced skill, and for professional divers it is a basic skill, as it is one of the primary functions of the standby diver. Upon reaching the surface, emergency services are always contacted as there is a possibility of further complications requiring medical attention. If symptoms develop other than a seizure underwater the diver should immediately switch to a gas with a lower oxygen fraction or ascend to a shallower depth if decompression obligations allow. If a chamber is available at the surface, surface decompression is a recommended option. The U.S. Navy has published procedures for completing decompression stops where a recompression chamber is not immediately available. Some dive computers will recalculate decompression requirements for alternative mixtures provided the actual gas setting is activated.

The occurrence of symptoms of bronchopulmonary dysplasia or acute respiratory distress syndrome is treated by lowering the fraction of oxygen administered, along with a reduction in the periods of exposure and an increase in the break periods where normal air is supplied. Where supplemental oxygen is required for treatment of another disease (particularly in infants), a ventilator may be needed to ensure that the lung tissue remains inflated. Reductions in pressure and exposure will be made progressively, and medications such as bronchodilators and pulmonary surfactants may be used.

Divers manage the risk of pulmonary damage by limiting exposure to levels shown to be generally acceptable by experimental evidence, using a system of accumulated oxygen toxicity units which are based on exposure time at specified partial pressures. In the event of emergency treatment for decompression illness, it may be necessary to exceed normal exposure limits to manage more critical symptoms.

Retinopathy of prematurity may regress spontaneously, but should the disease progress beyond a threshold (defined as five contiguous or eight cumulative hours of stage 3 retinopathy of prematurity), both cryosurgery and laser surgery have been shown to reduce the risk of blindness as an outcome. Where the disease has progressed further, techniques such as scleral buckling and vitrectomy surgery may assist in re-attaching the retina.

=== Repetitive exposure ===
Repeated exposure to potentially toxic oxygen concentrations in breathing gas is fairly common in hyperbaric activity, particularly in hyperbaric medicine, saturation diving, underwater habitats, and repetitive decompression diving. Research at the National Oceanic and Atmospheric Administration (NOAA) by R.W. Hamilton and others determined acceptable levels of exposure for single and repeated exposures. A distinction is made between acceptable exposure for acute and chronic toxicity, but these are really the extremes of a possible continuous range of exposures. A further distinction can be made between routine exposure and exposure required for emergency treatment, where a higher risk of oxygen toxicity may be justified to achieve a reduction of a more critical injury, particularly when in a relatively safe controlled and monitored environment.

The Repex (repetitive exposure) method, developed in 1988, allows oxygen toxicity dosage to be calculated using a single dose value equivalent to 1 minute of 100% oxygen at atmospheric pressure called an Oxygen Tolerance Unit (OTU), and is used to avoid toxic effects over several days of operational exposure. Some dive computers will automatically track the dosage based on measured depth and selected gas mixture. The limits allow a greater exposure when the person has not been exposed recently, and daily allowable dose decreases with an increase in consecutive days with exposure. These values may not be fully supported by current data.

NOAA REPEX limits for whole-body exposure in multiple day oxygen exposures
Days of exposure	average daily dose (OTU)	total dose (OTU)
1	850	850
2	700	1400
3	620	1860
4	525	2100
5	460	2300
6	420	2520
7	380	2660
8	350	2800
9	330	2970
10	310	3100
11 to 30	300	as calculated

Oxygen toxicity units per minute at varying partial pressure
P_{O_{2}} (atm)	OTU per minute
0.50	0.00
0.55	0.15
0.60	0.27
0.65	0.37
0.70	0.47
0.75	0.56
0.80	0.65
0.85	0.74
0.90	0.83
0.95	0.92
1.00	1.00
1.05	1.08
1.10	1.16
1.15	1.24
1.20	1.32
1.25	1.40
1.30	1.48
1.35	1.55
1.40	1.63
1.45	1.70
1.50	1.78
1.55	1.85
1.60	1.92
1.65	2.00
1.70	2.07
1.75	2.14
1.80	2.21
1.85	2.28
1.90	2.35
1.95	2.42
2.00	2.49

A more recent proposal uses a simple power equation, Toxicity Index (TI) = t^{2} × P_{O_{2}}^{c}, where t is time and c is the power term. This was derived from the chemical reactions producing reactive oxygen or nitrogen species, and has been shown to give good predictions for CNS toxicity with c = 6.8 and for pulmonary toxicity for c = 4.57.

For pulmonary toxicity, time is in hours, and P_{O_{2}} in atmospheres absolute, TI should be limited to 250.

For CNS toxicity, time is in minutes, P_{O_{2}} in atmospheres absolute, and a TI of 26,108 indicates a 1% risk.

== Prognosis ==
Although the convulsions caused by central nervous system oxygen toxicity may lead to incidental injury to the victim, it remained uncertain for many years whether damage to the nervous system following the seizure could occur and several studies searched for evidence of such damage. An overview of these studies by Bitterman in 2004 concluded that following removal of breathing gas containing high fractions of oxygen, no long-term neurological damage from the seizure remains.

The majority of infants who have survived following an incidence of bronchopulmonary dysplasia will eventually recover near-normal lung function, since lungs continue to grow during the first 5–7 years and the damage caused by bronchopulmonary dysplasia is to some extent reversible (even in adults). However, they are likely to be more susceptible to respiratory infections for the rest of their lives and the severity of later infections is often greater than that in their peers.

Retinopathy of prematurity (ROP) in infants frequently regresses without intervention and eyesight may be normal in later years. Where the disease has progressed to the stages requiring surgery, the outcomes are generally good for the treatment of stage 3 ROP, but are much worse for the later stages. Although surgery is usually successful in restoring the anatomy of the eye, damage to the nervous system by the progression of the disease leads to comparatively poorer results in restoring vision. The presence of other complicating diseases also reduces the likelihood of a favourable outcome.

Provision of supplementary oxygen remains of life-saving importance in critical care, and can increase survival in some chronic conditions, but hyperoxia and the formation of reactive oxygen species is involved in the pathogenesis of several life-threatening diseases. The toxic effects of hyperoxia are particularly prevalent in the pulmonary compartment, and cerebral and coronary circulations are at risk when vascular changes occur. Long-term hyperoxia harms the immune responses and susceptibility to infectious complications and tissue injury are increased.

== Epidemiology ==
Retinopathy of prematurity (ROP) in 1997 was more common in middle income countries where neonatal intensive care services were increasing; but greater awareness of the problem, leading to preventive measures, had not yet occurred.

The incidence of central nervous system toxicity among divers has decreased since the Second World War, as protocols have developed to limit exposure and partial pressure of oxygen inspired. In 1947, Donald recommended limiting the depth allowed for breathing pure oxygen to 7.6 m (25 ft), which equates to an oxygen partial pressure of 1.8 bar (180 kPa). Over time this limit has been reduced, until today a limit of 1.4 bar (140 kPa) during a recreational dive and 1.6 bar (160 kPa) during shallow decompression stops is generally recommended, though military divers using oxygen rebreathers may operate to greater depths for limited periods, at greater risk. Oxygen toxicity has now become a rare occurrence other than when caused by equipment malfunction and human error. Historically, the U.S. Navy has refined its Navy Diving Manual air and mixed gas tables to reduce oxygen toxicity incidents. Between 1995 and 1999, reports showed 405 surface-supported dives using the helium–oxygen tables; of these, oxygen toxicity symptoms were observed on 6 dives (1.5%). As a result, the U.S. Navy in 2000 modified the schedules and conducted field tests of 150 dives, none of which produced symptoms of oxygen toxicity. Revised tables were published in 2001.

The variability in tolerance and other variable factors such as workload have resulted in the U.S. Navy abandoning screening for oxygen tolerance. Of the 6,250 oxygen-tolerance tests performed between 1976 and 1997, only 6 episodes of oxygen toxicity were observed (0.1%).

Central nervous system oxygen toxicity among patients undergoing hyperbaric oxygen therapy is rare, and is influenced by a number of a factors: individual sensitivity and treatment protocol; and probably therapy indication and equipment used. A study by Welslau in 1996 reported 16 incidents out of a population of 107,264 patients (0.015%), while Hampson and Atik in 2003 found a rate of 0.03%. Yildiz, Ay and Qyrdedi, in a summary of 36,500 patient treatments between 1996 and 2003, reported only 3 oxygen toxicity incidents, giving a rate of 0.008%. A later review of over 80,000 patient treatments revealed an even lower rate: 0.0024%. The reduction in incidence may be partly due to use of a mask rather than a hood to deliver oxygen as there is less dead space in a mask.

The overall risk of CNS toxicity may be as high as 1 in 2000 to 3000 treatments. but it varies with the pressure and may be as high as 1 in 200 at higher pressure treatment schedules of 2.8 to 3.0 ATA, or as low as 1 in 10,000 for schedules at 2 ATA or less.

Bronchopulmonary dysplasia is among the most common complications of prematurely born infants and its incidence has grown as the survival of extremely premature infants has increased. Nevertheless, the severity has decreased as better management of supplemental oxygen has resulted in the disease now being related mainly to factors other than hyperoxia.

In 1997 a summary of studies of neonatal intensive care units in industrialised countries showed that up to 60% of low birth weight babies developed retinopathy of prematurity, which rose to 72% in extremely low birth weight babies, defined as less than 1 kg (2.2 lb) at birth. However, severe outcomes are much less frequent: for very low birth weight babies—those less than 1.5 kg (3.3 lb) at birth—the incidence of blindness was found to be no more than 8%.

Administration of supplemental oxygen is extensively and effectively used in emergency and intensive care medicine, but the reactive oxygen species caused by excessive oxygenation tend to cause a vicious cycle of tissue injury, characterized by cell damage, cell death, and inflammation, mostly in the lungs, which can exacerbate problems of tissue oxygenation for which the supplemental oxygen was intended as a treatment. Similar problems can occur in oxygen therapy for chronic conditions which involve hypoxia. Careful titration of oxygen supply to minimise the excess to physiological need also reduces pulmonary hyperoxic exposure to the reasonably practicable minimum. The incidence of pulmonary symptoms of oxygen toxicity is about 5%, and some drugs can increase the risk, such as the chemotherapeutic agent bleomycin.

== History ==
Paul Bert, a French physiologist, first described oxygen toxicity in 1878.

Central nervous system toxicity was first described by Paul Bert in 1878. He showed that oxygen was toxic to insects, arachnids, myriapods, molluscs, earthworms, fungi, germinating seeds, birds, and other animals. Central nervous system toxicity may be referred to as the "Paul Bert effect".

Pulmonary oxygen toxicity was first described by J. Lorrain Smith in 1899 when he noted central nervous system toxicity and discovered in experiments in mice and birds that 0.43 bar (43 kPa) had no effect but 0.75 bar (75 kPa) of oxygen was a pulmonary irritant. Pulmonary toxicity may be referred to as the "Lorrain Smith effect". The first recorded human exposure was undertaken in 1910 by Bornstein when two men breathed oxygen at 2.8 bar (280 kPa) for 30 minutes, while he went on to 48 minutes with no symptoms. In 1912, Bornstein developed cramps in his hands and legs while breathing oxygen at 2.8 bar (280 kPa) for 51 minutes. Smith then went on to show that intermittent exposure to a breathing gas with less oxygen permitted the lungs to recover and delayed the onset of pulmonary toxicity.

Albert R. Behnke et al. in 1935 were the first to observe visual field contraction (tunnel vision) on dives between 1.0 bar (100 kPa) and 4.1 bar (410 kPa). During World War II, Donald and Yarbrough et al. performed over 2,000 experiments on oxygen toxicity to support the initial use of closed circuit oxygen rebreathers. Naval divers in the early years of oxygen rebreather diving developed a mythology about a monster called "Oxygen Pete", who lurked in the bottom of the Admiralty Experimental Diving Unit "wet pot" (a water-filled hyperbaric chamber) to catch unwary divers. They called having an oxygen toxicity attack "getting a Pete".

In the decade following World War II, Lambertsen et al. made further discoveries on the effects of breathing oxygen under pressure and methods of prevention. Their work on intermittent exposures for extension of oxygen tolerance and on a model for prediction of pulmonary oxygen toxicity based on pulmonary function are key documents in the development of standard operating procedures when breathing increased pressures of oxygen. Lambertsen's work showing the effect of carbon dioxide in decreasing time to onset of central nervous system symptoms has influenced work from current exposure guidelines to future breathing apparatus design.

Retinopathy of prematurity was not observed before World War II, but with the availability of supplemental oxygen in the decade following, it rapidly became one of the principal causes of infant blindness in developed countries. By 1960 the use of oxygen had become identified as a risk factor and its administration restricted. The resulting fall in retinopathy of prematurity was accompanied by a rise in infant mortality and hypoxia-related complications. Since then, more sophisticated monitoring and diagnosis have established protocols for oxygen use which aim to balance between hypoxic conditions and problems of retinopathy of prematurity.

Bronchopulmonary dysplasia was first described by Northway in 1967, who outlined the conditions that would lead to the diagnosis. This was later expanded by Bancalari and in 1988 by Shennan, who suggested the need for supplemental oxygen at 36 weeks could predict long-term outcomes. Nevertheless, Palta et al. in 1998 concluded that radiographic evidence was the most accurate predictor of long-term effects.

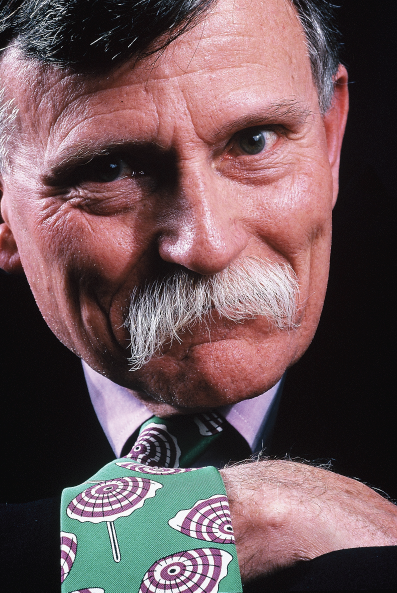
Robert W. Hamilton Jr, lead researcher on tolerable repetitive exposure limits at NOAA.

Bitterman et al. in 1986 and 1995 showed that darkness and caffeine would delay the onset of changes to brain electrical activity in rats. In the years since, research on central nervous system toxicity has centred on methods of prevention and safe extension of tolerance. Sensitivity to central nervous system oxygen toxicity has been shown to be affected by factors such as circadian rhythm, drugs, age, and gender. In 1988, Hamilton et al. wrote procedures for the National Oceanic and Atmospheric Administration to establish oxygen exposure limits for habitat operations. Even today, models for the prediction of pulmonary oxygen toxicity do not explain all the results of exposure to high partial pressures of oxygen.

== Society and culture ==
Recreational scuba divers commonly breathe nitrox containing up to 40% oxygen, while technical divers use pure oxygen or nitrox containing up to 80% oxygen to accelerate decompression. Divers who breathe oxygen fractions greater than of air (21%) need to be educated on the dangers of oxygen toxicity and how to manage the risk. To buy nitrox, a diver may be required to show evidence of relevant qualification.

Since the late 1990s the recreational use of oxygen has been promoted by oxygen bars, where customers breathe oxygen through a nasal cannula. Claims have been made that this reduces stress, increases energy, and lessens the effects of hangovers and headaches, despite the lack of any scientific evidence to support them. There are also devices on sale that offer "oxygen massage" and "oxygen detoxification" with claims of removing body toxins and reducing body fat. The U.S. Center for Drug Evaluation and Research cautions that people with heart or lung disease need their supplementary oxygen carefully regulated and should not use oxygen bars.

Victorian society had a fascination for the rapidly expanding field of science. In "Dr. Ox's Experiment", a short story written by Jules Verne in 1872, the eponymous doctor uses electrolysis of water to separate oxygen and hydrogen. He then pumps the pure oxygen throughout the town of Quiquendone, causing the normally tranquil inhabitants and their animals to become aggressive and plants to grow rapidly. An explosion of the hydrogen and oxygen in Dr Ox's factory brings his experiment to an end. Verne summarised his story by explaining that the effects of oxygen described in the tale were his own invention (they are not in any way supported by empirical evidence). There is also a brief episode of oxygen intoxication in his "From the Earth to the Moon".

== See also ==
- Effect of oxygen on chronic obstructive pulmonary disease
- Hypercapnia – Abnormally high tissue carbon dioxide levels
- Nitrogen narcosis – Narcotic effects of respiratory nitrogen

== Sources ==
- Clark, James M; Thom, Stephen R (2003). "Oxygen under pressure". In Brubakk, Alf O; Neuman, Tom S (eds.). Bennett and Elliott's physiology and medicine of diving (5th ed.). United States: Saunders. pp. 358–418. ISBN 978-0-7020-2571-6. OCLC 51607923.
- Clark, John M; Lambertsen, Christian J (1970). "Pulmonary oxygen tolerance in man and derivation of pulmonary oxygen tolerance curves". IFEM Report No. 1-70. Philadelphia, PA: Environmental Biomedical Stress Data Center, Institute for Environmental Medicine, University of Pennsylvania Medical Center.
- Donald, Kenneth W (1947). "Oxygen Poisoning in Man: Part I". British Medical Journal. 1 (4506): 667–72. doi:10.1136/bmj.1.4506.667. PMC 2053251. PMID 20248086.
- Donald, Kenneth W (1947). "Oxygen Poisoning in Man: Part II". British Medical Journal. 1 (4507): 712–17. doi:10.1136/bmj.1.4507.712. PMC 2053400. PMID 20248096.
  - Revised version of Donald's articles also available as:
  - Donald, Kenneth W (1992). Oxygen and the diver. UK: Harley Swan, 237 pages. ISBN 1-85421-176-5. OCLC 26894235.
- Hamilton, Robert W; Thalmann, Edward D (2003). "Decompression practice". In Brubakk, Alf O; Neuman, Tom S (eds.). Bennett and Elliott's physiology and medicine of diving (5th ed.). United States: Saunders. pp. 475–79. ISBN 978-0-7020-2571-6. OCLC 51607923.
- Lang, Michael A, ed. (2001). DAN nitrox workshop proceedings. Durham, NC: Divers Alert Network, 197 pages.
- Regillo, Carl D; Brown, Gary C; Flynn, Harry W (1998). Vitreoretinal Disease: The Essentials. New York: Thieme, 693 pages. ISBN 978-0-86577-761-3. OCLC 39170393.
- U.S. Navy Supervisor of Diving (2011). U.S. Navy Diving Manual (PDF). SS521-AG-PRO-010 0910-LP-106-0957, revision 6 with Change A entered. U.S. Naval Sea Systems Command. Archived from the original (PDF) on 10 December 2014.
