= Moran Campbell =

Inventor of Venturi Mask

Edward James Moran Campbell
- Born: August 31, 1925; Yorkshire, England
- Died: April 12, 2004 (aged 78); Dundas (Hamilton), Ontario
- Occupations: Physician, Scientist
- Awards: Order of Canada

Edward James Moran Campbell, OC FRSC (August 31, 1925 – April 12, 2004) was a Canadian physician. He was the founding Chair of the Department of Medicine at McMaster Faculty of Health Sciences from 1968 to 1975. He was also the inventor of the Venturi mask.

Born in England, the son of a Yorkshire general practitioner, he received his Doctor of Medicine from Middlesex Hospital Medical School (now University College Hospital) in London in 1949. In 1960, he published a paper for the Venturi mask, a method for delivering constant specific oxygen concentration to a patient, crucial for treating lung disease. In 1965, he delivered the Goulstonian lectures at the Royal College of Physicians in London. In 1968, he moved to Canada to become the founding chair of medicine at McMaster University's new medical school. There he helped to establish the schools problem based teaching method. Medical students were not given formal testing and instead were given realistic problems to solve and avoided use of traditional testing examinations. While living in Hamilton, ON, he was an active member of the community and fought for the protection of the bike paths in the city. He was elected as Fellow of the Royal Society of Canada in 1983 and made an Officer of the Order of Canada in 2001. His memoirs about his struggle with manic-depression, Not Always on the Level (ISBN 0727901842) was published in 1988.

He died in 2004 after a long battle with colon cancer.
