= Redento D. Ferranti =

American-Italian pulmonologist (1923–2008)

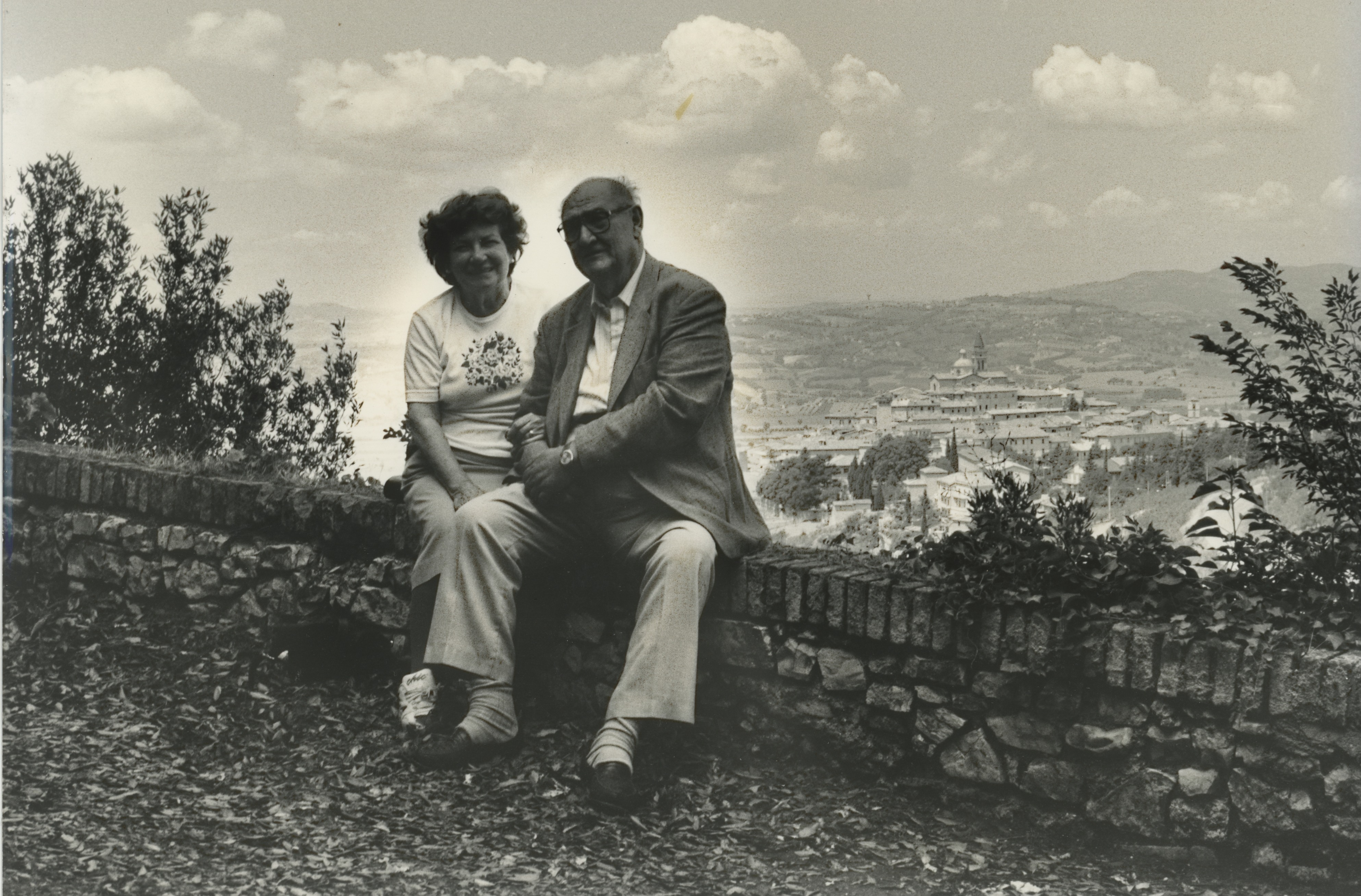
- Ferranti with wife Ida in Trevi, Italy
- Born: March 4, 1923; Sulmona, Italy
- Died: July 29, 2008 (aged 85); New Haven, Connecticut
- Resting place: Trevi, Italy
- Other name: Tino Ferranti
- Citizenship: United States
- Occupation: Pulmonologist
- Spouse: Ida Ferranti
- Children: 6

Redento D. Ferranti (March 4, 1923 – July 29, 2008) was born in Sulmona, Italy, and was a pioneer in the United States in the field of care for chronic respiratory patients and pulmonary rehabilitation. Ferranti was one of the first to introduce long term oxygen therapy in the U.S. as an effective approach to rehabilitation for COPD patients, and was one of the first physicians to introduce the use of liquid oxygen in small portable containers. His early work in the field of pulmonology earned him the title "father of modern pulmonary rehabilitation." He was a staff physician, director of pulmonary medicine, and medical director at Gaylord Hospital in Wallingford, Connecticut, from 1969 to 1997, and an Associate Clinical Professor of Medicine at Yale University. Ferranti was instrumental in developing Gaylord Hospital's treatment of pulmonary patients and was an early champion of sleep studies, leading the hospital's largest sleep study program in New England and one of the largest in the country. He received many awards including The American Lung Association and Connecticut Thoracic Society's Humanitarian Award and the Gaylord Medal.
