= Venturi mask =

Medical device

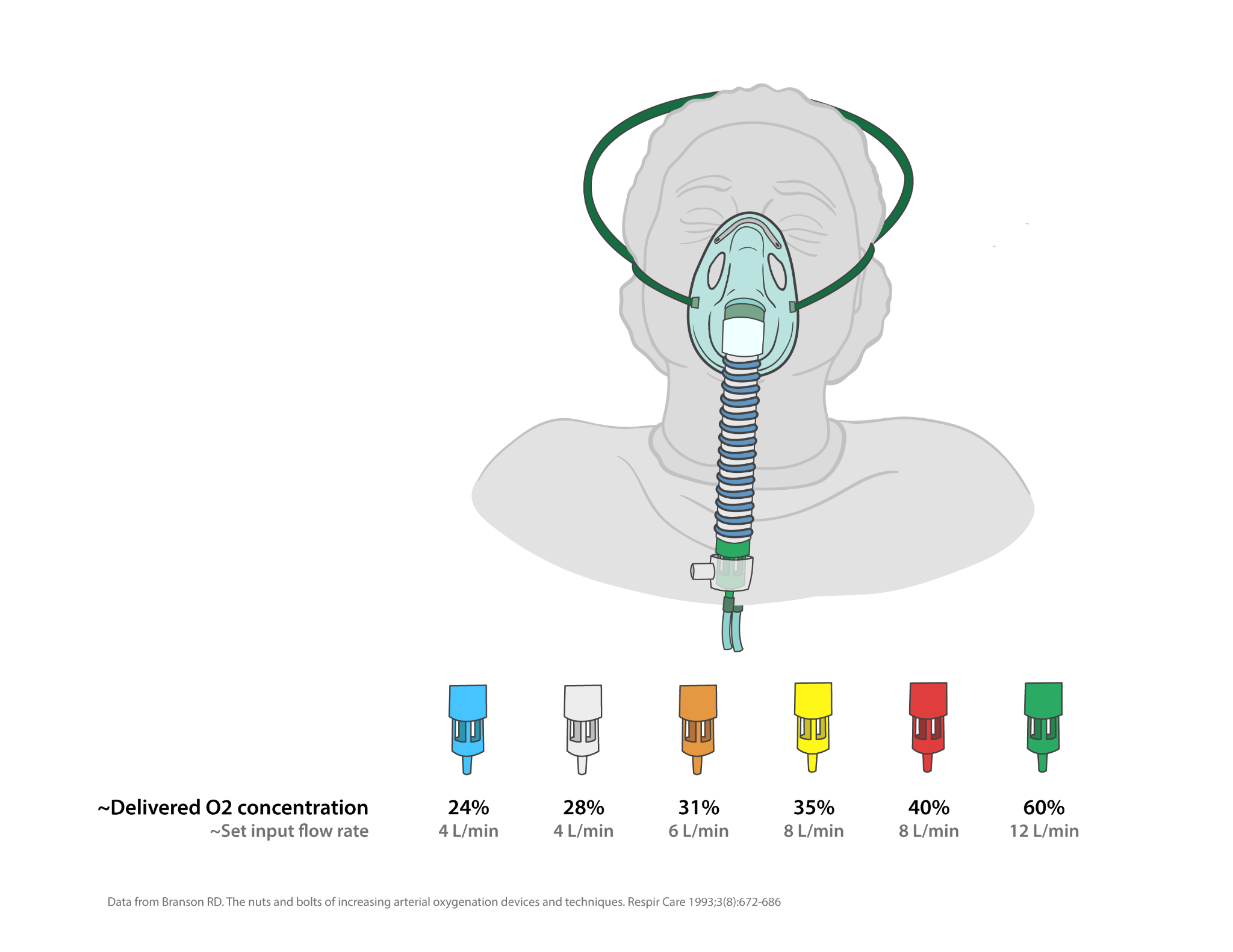
Adult with air entrainment (Venturi) mask

The venturi mask, also known as an air-entrainment mask, is a medical device to deliver a known oxygen concentration to patients on controlled oxygen therapy. The mask was invented by Moran Campbell at McMaster University Medical School as a replacement for intermittent oxygen treatment. Campbell was fond of quoting John Scott Haldane's description of intermittent oxygen treatment; "bringing a drowning man to the surface – occasionally". By contrast the venturi mask offered a constant supply of oxygen at a much more precise range of concentrations.

== Use ==
Venturi masks are used to deliver a specified fraction of inspired oxygen (F_{I}O_{2}). Many masks are color-coded and have a recommended oxygen flow specified on them. When used with this oxygen flow, the mask should provide the specified F_{I}O_{2}. Other brands of mask have a rotating attachment that controls the air entrainment window, affecting the concentration of oxygen. This system is often used with air-entrainment nebulizers to provide humidification and oxygen therapy. The total flow of gas (oxygen plus the entrained air) will be greater than the patient's peak inspiratory flow so the delivered F_{I}O_{2} is independent of their respiratory pattern.

A controlled F_{I}O_{2} is particularly important for patients whose ventilation is dependent on hypoxic drive, as may be seen in patients with chronic obstructive pulmonary disease. Administration of too much oxygen may lead to a reduction in their respiratory rate and retention of carbon dioxide, and ultimately to reduced consciousness or even death.

== Mechanism ==
The mechanism of action is variously described with reference to the venturi effect or Bernoulli's principle. However, a fixed performance oxygen delivery system works on the principle of jet mixing. Where the flow of moving oxygen meets the static air, viscous shearing causes a predictable amount of the air to be dragged into the flow.

== See also ==
- Oxygen mask for masks used in various settings
