= Oxygen bar =

Establishment that sells oxygen for on-site recreational use

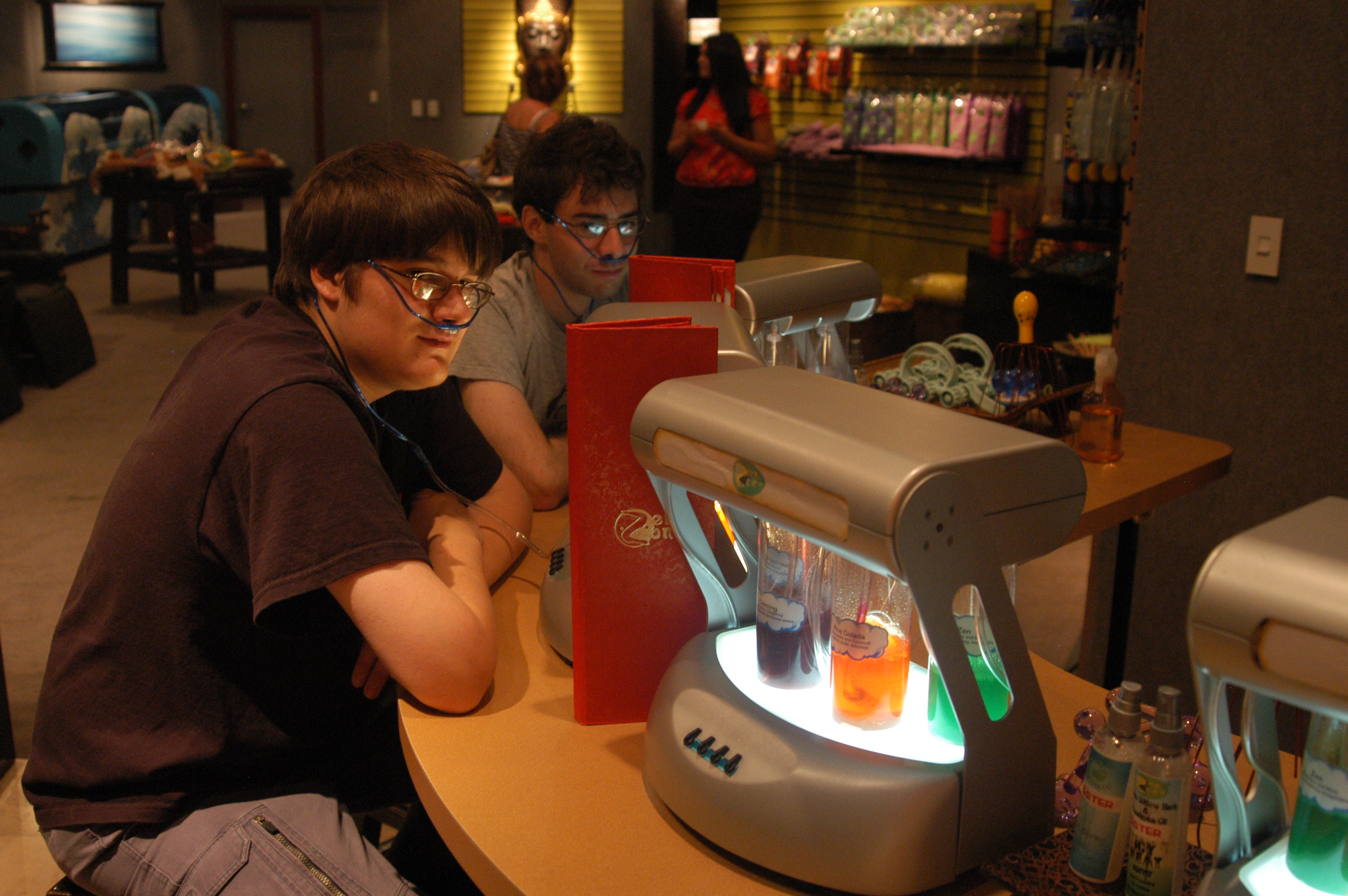
Interior of an oxygen bar

An oxygen bar is an establishment, or part of one, that sells oxygen for recreational use. Individual scents may be added to enhance the experience. The flavors in an oxygen bar come from bubbling oxygen through bottles containing aromatic solutions before it reaches the nostrils: most bars use food-grade particles to produce the scent, but some bars use aroma oils.

== History ==
In 1776, Thomas Henry, an apothecary and Fellow of the Royal Society of England speculated tongue in cheek that Joseph Priestley’s newly discovered dephlogisticated air (now called oxygen) might become "as fashionable as French wine at the fashionable taverns". He did not expect, however, that tavern goers would "relish calling for a bottle of Air, instead of Claret."

Another early reference to the recreational use of oxygen is found in Jules Verne's 1870 novel Around the Moon. In this work, Verne states:

Do you know, my friends, that a curious establishment might be founded with rooms of oxygen, where people whose system is weakened could for a few hours live a more active life. Fancy parties where the room was saturated with this heroic fluid, theaters where it should be kept at high pressure; what passion in the souls of the actors and spectators! what fire, what enthusiasm! And if, instead of an assembly only a whole people could be saturated, what activity in its functions, what a supplement to life it would derive. From an exhausted nation they might make a great and strong one, and I know more than one state in old Europe which ought to put itself under the regime of oxygen for the sake of its health!

Modeled after the "air stations" in polluted downtown Tokyo and Beijing, the first oxygen bar (the O2 Spa Bar) opened in Toronto, Canada, in 1996. The trend continued in North America and by the late 1990s, bars were in use in New York, California, Florida, Las Vegas and the Rocky Mountain region. Customers in these bars breathe oxygen through a plastic nasal cannula inserted into their nostrils. Oxygen bars can now be found in many venues such as nightclubs, salons, spas, health clubs, resorts, tanning salons, restaurants, coffee houses, bars, airports, ski chalets, yoga studios, chiropractors, and casinos. They can also be found at trade shows, conventions and corporate meetings, as well as at private parties and promotional events.

== Provision of oxygen ==
Oxygen bar guests pay about one U.S. dollar per minute to inhale a percentage of oxygen greater than the normal atmospheric content of 20.9% oxygen. This oxygen is gathered from the ambient air by an industrial (non-medical) oxygen concentrator and inhaled through a nasal cannula for up to about 20 minutes.

The machines used by oxygen bars or oxygen vendors differ from the typical medical-issue machine, although customers use the cannula, the rubber tube apparatus that fits around the ears and inserts in the nostrils, to breathe in the oxygen. Customers can enhance their experience by using aromatherapy scents to be added to the oxygen, such as lavender or mint.

== Health risks and benefit claims ==
It has been claimed by alternative medicine that the human body is oxygen-deprived, and that oxygen will remove "toxins" and even cure cancer. Proponents claim this practice is not only safe, but enhances health and well-being, including strengthening the immune system, enhancing concentration, reducing stress, increasing energy and alertness, lessening the effects of hangovers, headaches, and sinus problems, and generally relaxing the body. It has also been alleged to help with altitude sickness. However, no long-term, well-controlled scientific studies have confirmed any of the proponents' claims. Furthermore, the human body is adapted to 21 percent oxygen, and the blood exiting the lungs already has about 97 percent of the oxygen that it could carry bound to hemoglobin. Having a higher oxygen fraction in the lungs serves no purpose, and may actually be detrimental.

The medical profession warns that individuals with respiratory diseases such as asthma and emphysema should not inhale too much oxygen. Higher than normal oxygen partial pressure can also indirectly cause carbon dioxide narcosis in patients with chronic obstructive pulmonary disease (COPD). The FDA warns that in some situations, droplets of flavoring oil can be inhaled, which may contribute to an inflammation of the lungs. Some oxygen bar companies offer safe water-based aromas for flavoring in order to maintain compliance and stay within FDA guidelines.

Oxygen may also cause serious side effects at excessive doses. Although the effects of oxygen toxicity at atmospheric pressure can cause lung damage, the low fraction of oxygen (30–40%) and relatively brief exposures make pulmonary toxicity unlikely. Nevertheless, due caution should be exercised when consuming oxygen. In the UK, the Health and Safety Executive publishes guidance on equipment (including tubing) and on staff training, as well as warning on potential hazards, and makes several recommendations to ensure safe practice, principally to minimise fire risks.

Another concern is the improper maintenance of oxygen equipment. Some oxygen concentrators use clay filters which cause micro-organisms to grow, creating an additional danger that can cause lung infections.

== Safety hazards ==
Raised concentrations of oxygen increase the risk of ignition, the rate and heat of combustion, and the difficulty of extinguishing a fire. Many materials that will not burn in air will burn in a sufficiently high partial pressure of oxygen.

== Regulations ==
In the United States, the Federal Food, Drug, and Cosmetic Act defines any substance used for breathing and administered by another person as a prescription drug. Melvin Szymanski, a consumer safety officer in the Food and Drug Administration's (FDA) Center for Drug Evaluation and Research, has explained that at one end of the hose is a source of oxygen, so the individual providing the hose and turning on the supply is dispensing a prescription drug. He commented that "Although oxygen bars that dispense oxygen without a prescription violate FDA regulations, the agency applies regulatory discretion to permit the individual state boards of licensing to enforce the requirements pertaining to the dispensing of oxygen."

In the state of Massachusetts, oxygen bars are illegal.

== See also ==
- Oxygen toxicity – Toxic effects of breathing oxygen at high partial pressures
- Alcohol inhalation – Method of administering alcohol directly into the respiratory system
- Carbogen – Mixture of carbon dioxide and oxygen
- Juice bar – Naturally occurring liquid present in fruits and vegetables
- Fire hazard – Practices to reduce the results of fire
