= Effect of oxygen on chronic obstructive pulmonary disease =

In some individuals, the effect of oxygen on chronic obstructive pulmonary disease (COPD) is to cause increased carbon dioxide retention.

== Signs and symptoms ==
In individuals with chronic obstructive pulmonary disease and similar lung problems, the clinical features of excessive oxygen administration are due to high carbon dioxide content in the blood (hypercapnia). Increasing levels of carbon dioxide in the blood leads to decreased consciousness, deranged acid-base balance due to respiratory acidosis, and death.

== Causes ==
Many people with chronic obstructive pulmonary disease have a low partial pressure of oxygen (PaO_{2}) in the blood and high partial pressure of carbon dioxide (PaCO_{2}). Treatment with supplemental oxygen may improve their well-being; alternatively, in some this can lead to the adverse effect of elevating the carbon dioxide content in the blood (hypercapnia) to levels that may become toxic. The two main contributors to this increase in PaCO_{2} are ventilation–perfusion mismatch and the Haldane effect.

- Ventilation/perfusion mismatch: under-ventilated lung usually has a low oxygen content which leads to localized vasoconstriction limiting blood flow to that lung tissue. Supplemental oxygen abolishes this constriction, leading to alveoli with relatively poor ventilation being well-perfused. This mismatch leads to a redistribution of blood to areas of the lung with poor ventilation, reducing the amount of carbon dioxide eliminated from the system.
- The Haldane effect: most carbon dioxide is carried by the blood as bicarbonate (HCO^{−}_{3}), and deoxygenated hemoglobin promotes the production of bicarbonate. Increasing the amount of oxygen in the blood by administering supplemental oxygen reduces the amount of deoxygenated hemoglobin, and thus reduces the capacity of blood to carry carbon dioxide.

Historically, it was believed that oxygen-induced hypercapnia in COPD resulted from the 'hypoxic drive' mechanism. Normally, the stimulation to take another breath occurs primarily from a slight rise in PaCO_{2}. The slight rise in PaCO_{2} stimulates the respiratory centre in the brain, creating the impulse to take another breath. In some patients with a chronically high level of PaCO_{2}, such as those with COPD, the stimulus and drive to breathe from increased PaCO_{2} is diminished, and contribution of PaO_{2} to stimulate breathing becomes more significant. Thus, when oxygen is administered to patients with known CO_{2} retention, a minute decrease in ventilation can occur, contributing to increased PaCO_{2}. While historically a decrease in minute ventilation was considered the main driver of oxygen-induced hypercapnia in COPD, it is now known to be the smallest of the contributors to increases in PaCO_{2}.

== Prevention ==
In people with chronic obstructive pulmonary disease, carbon dioxide toxicity can be prevented by careful control of the supplemental oxygen. In those with an acute exacerbation of COPD, hypoxic pulmonary vasoconstriction can improve gas exchange, and so just enough oxygen is given to maintain an oxygen saturation of 88%–92%.
