= Fitness to dive =

Medical fitness to function underwater

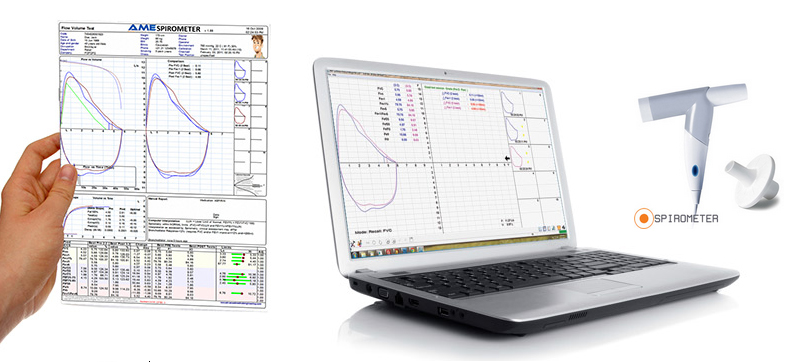
PC-based spirometer output

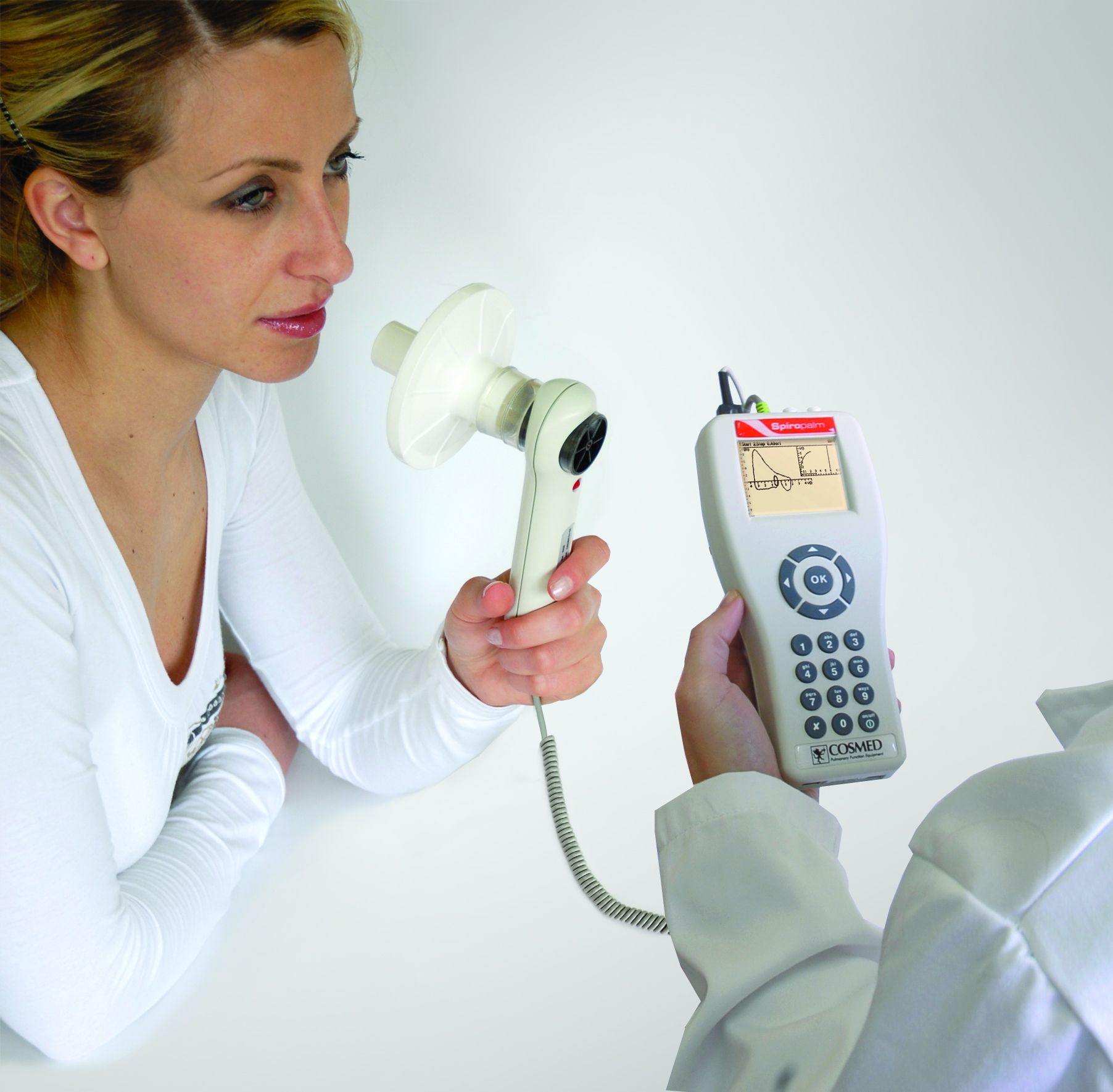
Hand held spirometer with display and transducer

Fitness to dive (more specifically medical fitness to dive) refers to the medical and physical suitability of a diver to function safely in an underwater environment using diving equipment and related procedures. Depending on the circumstances, it may be established with a signed statement by the diver that they do not have any of the listed disqualifying conditions. The diver must be able to fulfill the ordinary physical requirements of diving as per the detailed medical examination by a physician registered as a medical examiner of divers following a procedural checklist. A legal document of fitness to dive issued by the medical examiner is also necessary.

The most important medical evaluation is the one before starting diving, as the diver can be screened to prevent exposure in the event of an imminent danger. The other important medical assessments are after some significant illness, where medical intervention is needed and has to be done by a doctor proficient in diving medicine, and can not be done by prescriptive rules.

Psychological factors can affect fitness to dive, particularly where they affect response to emergencies, or risk-taking behavior. The use of medical and recreational drugs can also influence fitness to dive, both for physiological and behavioral reasons. In some cases, prescription drug use might have a net positive effect when viably treating an underlying condition. However, the side effects of viable medication frequently have undesirable influences on the fitness of a diver. Most cases of recreational drug use result in an impaired fitness to dive, and a significantly increased risk of sub-optimal response to emergencies.

== General requirements ==
The medical, mental and physical fitness of professional divers is important for safety at work for the diver and the other members of the diving team.

As a general principle, fitness to dive is dependent on the absence of conditions which would constitute an unacceptable risk for the diver, and for professional divers, to any member of the diving team. General physical fitness requirements are also often specified by a certifying agency, and are usually related to ability to swim and perform the activities that are associated with the relevant type of diving.

The general hazards of diving are much the same for recreational divers and professional divers, but the risks vary with the diving procedures used. These risks are reduced by appropriate skills and equipment.

Medical fitness to dive generally implies that the diver has no known medical conditions that limit the ability to do the job, jeopardize the safety of the diver or the team, that might get worse as an effect of diving, or predispose the diver to diving or occupational illness.

There are three types of diver medical assessment: initial assessments, routine re-assessments and special re-assessments after injury or decompression illness.

=== Fitness of recreational divers ===
Standards for fitness to dive are specified by the diver certification agency that issues the certification following training. Some agencies place the responsibility for assessing fitness largely on the individual diver, while others require an examination by a registered medical practitioner based on specified criteria. These criteria are generally consistent across certification agencies and are adapted from standards for professional divers, though they may be somewhat relaxed for recreational diving.

The purpose of establishing fitness to dive is to reduce risk of a range of diving related medical conditions associated with known or suspected pre-existing conditions, and is not generally an indication of the person's psychological suitability for diving and has no reference to their diving skills.

A certification of fitness to dive is generally for a specified period, (usually a year or less), and may specify limitations or restrictions.

In most cases, a statement or certificate of fitness to dive for recreational divers is only required during training courses. Ordinary recreational diving is at the diver's own risk. The medical literature, anecdotal evidence and small-scale surveys suggest that a significant part of the recreational scuba diving population may have chronic medical conditions that affect their fitness to dive according to the Recreational Scuba Training Council's guidelines, are aware of these, and continue to dive. It has not been established whether the risk associated with these conditions is clinically significant or whether repeated screening is necessary or desirable, or whether the risks traditionally associated with some contraindicated conditions are realistic. It is also not clear whether these conditions were generally present at initial screening but not known or disclosed, or whether they developed afterwards, and if so, whether in some cases they are consequences of diving injury.

In rare cases, state or national legislation may require recreational divers to be examined by registered medical examiners of divers. In France, Norway, Portugal and Israel. recreational divers are required by regulation to be examined for medical fitness to dive.

==== Standard forms for recreational diving ====
Recreational diver certification agencies may provide a standard document which the diver is required to complete, specifying whether any of a range of conditions apply to the diver. If no disqualifying conditions are admitted, the diver is considered to be fit to dive.

The RSTC medical statement is used by all RSTC member affiliates: RSTC Canada, RSTC, RSTC-Europe and IAC (former Barakuda), FIAS, ANIS, SSI Europe, PADI Norway, PADI Sweden, PADI Asia Pacific, PADI Japan, PADI Canada, PADI Americas, PADI Worldwide, IDD Europe, YMCA, IDEA, PDIC, SSI International, BSAC Japan and NASDS Japan.

Other certification agencies may rely on the competence of a general practitioner to assess fitness to dive, either with or without an agency specified checklist.

In some cases the certification agency may require a medical examination by a registered medical examiner of divers.

In 2020-21, a revised World Recreational Scuba Training Council diver participation questionnaire and Diving Medical Guidance to the Physician form were published, following a three-year review by the Diving Medical Screen Committee.

=== Fitness of professional divers ===
The requirements for medical examination and certification of fitness of professional divers is typically regulated by national or state legislation for occupational health and safety

== Fitness testing procedures ==
Typical output from a spirometer of a normal person taking 4 tidal breaths, followed by maximal inspiration and expiration. Corresponding volumes and capacities are noted in the right-hand boxes.

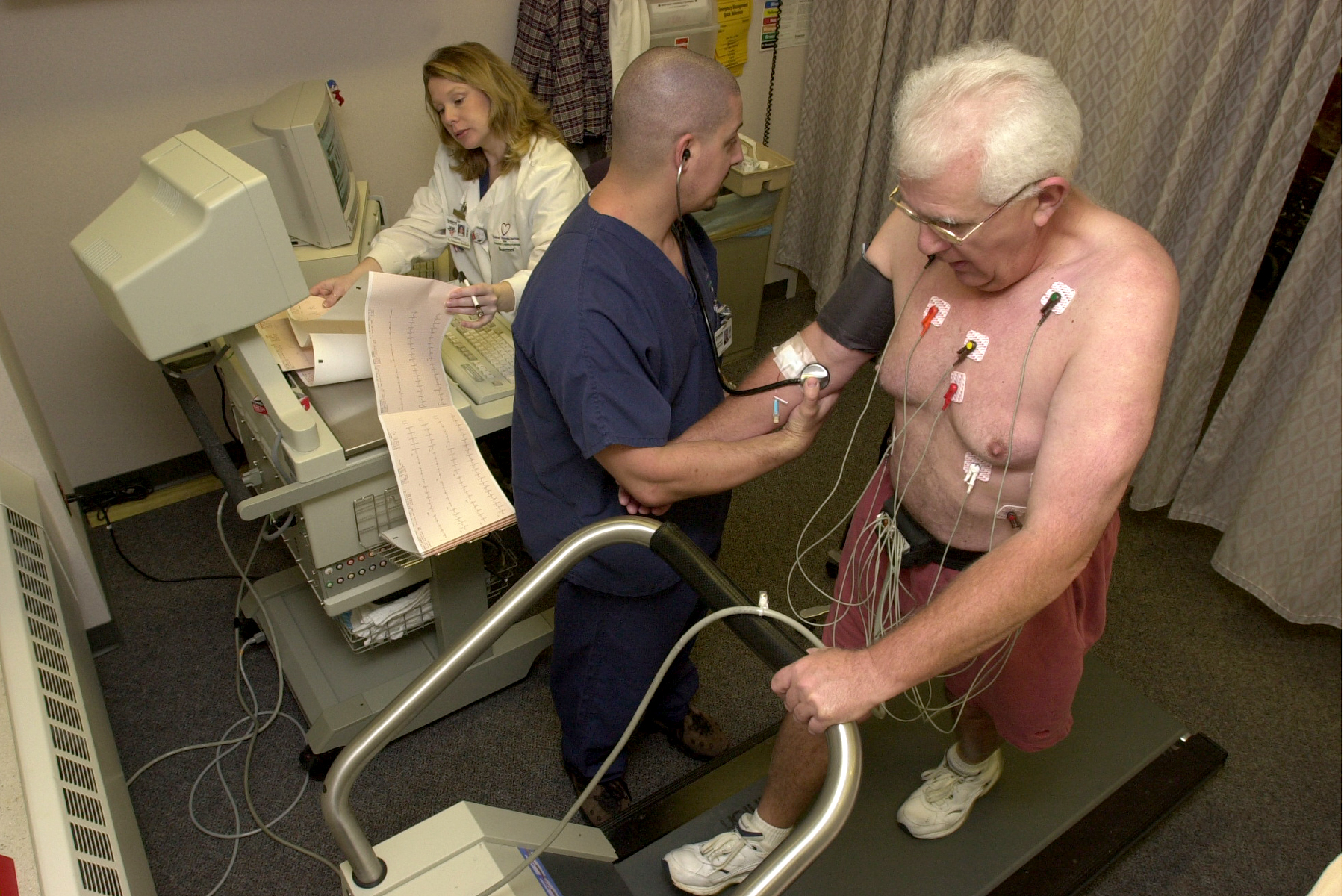
Cardiac stress test

=== Lung function tests ===
A frequently used test for lung function for divers is spirometry, which measures the amount (volume) and/or speed (flow) of air that can be inhaled and exhaled. Spirometry is an important tool used for generating pneumotachographs, which are helpful in assessing conditions such as asthma, pulmonary fibrosis, cystic fibrosis, and COPD, all of which are contraindications for diving. Sometimes only peak expiratory flow (PEF) is measured, which uses a much simpler apparatus, but is still useful to give an indication of lung overpressure risk.

=== Cardiac stress test ===
The cardiac stress test is done with heart stimulation, either by exercise on a treadmill, or pedaling a stationary exercise bicycle ergometer, with the patient connected to an electrocardiogram (or ECG).

The Harvard Step Test is a type of cardiac stress test for detecting and/or diagnosing cardiovascular disease. It also is a good measurement of fitness, and the ability to recover after a strenuous exercise, and is sometimes used as an alternative for the cardiac stress test.

== Medical examiner of divers ==
The most important medical examination is the one before starting diving, as the diver can be screened to prevent exposure when a dangerous condition exists. The other important medicals are after some significant illness, where medical intervention is needed there and has to be done by a doctor who is competent in diving medicine, and can not be done by prescriptive rules. For medical examinations prescribed in terms of occupational health legislation, the examiner may be required to be registered as a specialist in diving medicine, or be registered as competent to make medical examinations on divers, which implies an awareness of the physiological effects of diving and the mechanisms of diving diseases. Standards and levels of specialization and registration vary considerably between countries, and international recognition is limited. In most cases, medical examination for recreational divers is not compulsory, therefore international recognition of medical examiners is not relevant.

== Disqualifying conditions ==
The general principles for disqualification are that diving causes a deterioration in the medical condition and the medical condition presents an excessive risk for a diving injury to both the individual and the diving partner.

There are some conditions that are considered absolute contraindications for diving. Details vary between recreational and professional diving and in different parts of the world. Those listed below are widely recognized.

=== Permanently disqualifying conditions ===
- Stroke and transient ischemic attacks.
- Intercranial aneurysm, arterial-venous malformation or tumor.
- Exertional angina, postmyocardial infarction with left ventricular dysfunction, congestive heart failure, or dependence on medication to control dysrhythmias.
- Postcoronary bypass surgery with violation of pleural spaces.
- A history of spontaneous pneumothorax.

=== Temporarily disqualifying conditions ===
Any illness requiring drug treatment may constitute a temporary disqualification if either the illness or the drug may compromise diving safety. Sedatives, tranquilizers, antidepressants, antihistamines, anti-diabetic drugs, steroids, anti-hypertensives, anti-epilepsy drugs, alcohol and hallucinatory drugs such as marijuana and LSD may increase risk to the diver. Some drugs which affect brain function have unpredictable effects on a diver exposed to high pressure in deep diving.

== Conditions which may disqualify or require restrictions depending on severity and management ==
Some medical conditions may temporarily or permanently disqualify a person from diving depending on severity and the specific requirements of the registration body. These conditions may also require the diver to restrict the scope of activities or take specific additional precautions. They are also referred to as relative contraindications, and may be acute or chronic.

=== Asthma ===
In the past, asthma was generally considered a contraindication for diving due to theoretical concern about an increased risk for pulmonary barotrauma and decompression sickness. The conservative approach arbitrarily disqualified asthmatics from diving. This has not stopped asthmatics from diving, and experience in the field and data in the current literature do not support this dogmatic approach. Asthma has a similar prevalence in divers as in the general population.

The theoretical concern for asthmatic divers is that pulmonary obstruction, air trapping, and hyperinflation may increase risk for pulmonary barotrauma, and the diver may be exposed to environmental factors that increase the risk of bronchospasm and the development of an acute asthmatic attack which could lead to panic and drowning. As of 2016, there is no epidemiological evidence for an increased relative risk of pulmonary barotrauma, decompression sickness or death among divers with asthma. This evidence only accounts for asthmatics with mild disease and the actual risk for severe or uncontrolled asthmatics may be higher.

=== Cancers ===
Cancers are generally considered a class of abnormal, fast growing and disordered cells which have the potential to spread to other parts of the body. They may occur in virtually any organ or tissue. The effect of a cancer on fitness to dive can vary considerably, and will depend on several factors. If the cancer or the treatment compromise the diver's ability to perform the normal activities associated with diving, including the necessary physical fitness, and particularly cancers or treatments which compromise fitness to withstand the pressure changes, then the diver should abstain from diving until passed as fit by a diving medical practitioner who is aware of the condition. Specific considerations include whether the tumor or treatment affects organs which are directly affected by pressure changes, whether the person's capacity to manage themselves in an emergency is compromised, including mental awareness and judgement, and that diving should not aggravate the disease. Some cancers, such as lung cancer would be an absolute contraindication.

=== Diabetes ===
Like asthma, the traditional medical response to diabetes was to declare the person unfit to dive, but in a similar way, a significant number of divers with well-managed diabetes have logged sufficient dives to provide statistical evidence that it can be done at acceptable risk, and the recommendations of diving medical researchers and insurers has changed accordingly.

Current (2016) medical opinion of Divers Alert Network (DAN) and the Diving Diseases Research Centre (DDRC) is that diabetics should not dive if they have any of the following complications:

- Significant retinopathy increases risk of retinal hemorrhage due to minor mask squeeze or equalizing procedures.
- Peripheral vascular disease and/or neuropathy increase risk of sudden death due to coronary artery disease,
- Significant autonomic or peripheral neuropathy increases the risk of exaggerated hypotension when leaving the water.
- Nephropathy causing proteinuria
- Coronary artery disease
- Significant peripheral vascular disease may reduce inert gas washout and predispose the diver to limb decompression sickness.

DAN makes the following recommendations for additional precautions by diabetic divers:

- Diabetic divers are advised not to dive deeper than 30 msw (100 fsw), to avoid situations where nitrogen narcosis could be confused with hypoglycemia, not to dive for longer than one hour, to limit the time blood glucose levels would remain unmonitored, or to incur compulsory decompression stops, or dive in overhead environments, both of which make direct and immediate access to the surface unavailable.
- Diabetic diver's buddy or dive leader who is informed of their condition and knows the appropriate response in the event of a hypoglycemic episode. It is also recommended the buddy does not have diabetes.
- Diabetic divers should avoid circumstances that increase risk of hypoglycemic episodes such as prolonged cold and strenuous dives.

=== Epilepsy ===
Epilepsy is a central nervous system disorder in which the person has had at least two seizures, often for no discernible cause. Even if no one with a history of epilepsy dived, a few people would experience their first seizure while diving. As a seizure may involve loss of consciousness, this puts the convulsing diver at significant risk, particularly on scuba with half mask and demand valve, which may become dislodged.

If epilepsy is required to be controlled by medication, diving is contraindicated. A possible acceptable risk would be a history of febrile seizures in infancy, apneic spells or seizures attendant to acute illness such as encephalitis and meningitis, all without recurrence without medication. By 2004 the UK Sport Diving Medical Committee ruled that a person with epilepsy must go 5 years without fits and off medication before being passed to dive. Very little reliable epidemiological evidence exists to suggest that a past history of seizures may correlate with increased risk to recreational scuba divers.

- Published literature does not support an association between decompression illness and epilepsy, however, if a seizure occurs underwater it may plausibly lead to an uncontrolled ascent, which is associated with a high risk of decompression illness. A seizure underwater is similarly likely to cause dislodging of the demand valve with consequent high risk of drowning.
- There is also no reliable evidence that epileptics are differently sensitive to raised partial pressures of oxygen. It is now known that the mechanism of the epileptic seizure is different to the oxygen toxicity seizure, and epileptics are not more susceptible to convulse under pressure.
- No evidence suggests that a person with a history of seizures is likely to be more sensitive to nitrogen narcosis.
- No plausible reasons to suggest that antiepileptic drugs would increase the risk of oxygen toxicity have been published. In theory it is possible that they may provide some level of protection.

Most objections to allowing people who have a long history of no seizures to dive are largely theoretical, and in many cases entirely unsupported by reliable evidence.

The British Diving Diseases Research Centre (DDRC) recommendation as of 2019 is that if a person previously had epilepsy but has been off medication without seizure for at least five years they may be fit to dive. If the seizures were exclusively nocturnal, this is reduced to three years. Medical advice from a diving doctor is recommended.

The European Diving Technology Committee guidelines for fitness to dive states that epilepsy is a contraindication to occupational diving, but that where a diver has been free of seizures for ten years without treatment they may be assessed by an expert for fitness to dive.

=== Pregnancy ===
A study investigating potential links between diving while pregnant and fetal abnormalities by evaluating field data showed that most women are complying with the diving industry recommendation and refraining from diving while pregnant. There were insufficient data to establish significant correlation between diving and fetal abnormalities, and differences in placental circulation between humans and other animals limit the applicability of animal research for pregnancy and diving studies.

The literature indicates that diving during pregnancy does increase the risk to the fetus, but to an uncertain extent. As diving is an avoidable risk for most women, the prudent choice is to avoid diving while pregnant. However, if diving is done before pregnancy is recognized, there is generally no indication for concern.

In addition to possible risk to the fetus, changes in a woman's body during pregnancy might make diving more problematic. There may be problems fitting equipment and the associated hazards of ill fitting equipment. Swelling of the mucous membranes in the sinuses could make ear clearing difficult, and nausea may increase discomfort.

=== Diving after childbirth ===
Divers who want to return to diving after having a child should generally follow the guidelines suggested for other sports and activities, as diving requires a similar level of conditioning and fitness.

After a vaginal delivery, without complications, three weeks is usually sufficient to allow the cervix to close, which reduces the risk of uterine infection. Divers Alert Network recommends as a rule of thumb, to wait four weeks after normal delivery before resuming diving, and at least eight weeks after cesarean delivery. Any complications may indicate a longer wait, and medical clearance is advised.

=== Patent foramen ovale ===
A patent foramen ovale (PFO), or atrial shunt can potentially cause a paradoxical gas embolism by allowing venous blood containing what would normally be asymptomatic inert gas decompression bubbles to shunt from the right atrium to the left atrium during exertion, and can be then circulated to the vital organs where an embolism may form and grow due to local tissue supersaturation during decompression. This congenital condition is found in roughly 25% of adults, and is not listed as a disqualifier from diving nor as a required medical test for professional or recreational divers. Some training organisations recommend that divers contemplating technical diver training should have themselves tested as a precaution, and to allow informed consent to assume the associated risks.

== Factors which temporarily affect fitness to dive ==
Several factors may temporarily affect fitness to dive by altering the risk of encountering problems during a dive. Some of these depend on conditions that vary according to time or place, and are not addressed in a medical examination. Others are more within the control of the diver. These include:

- Fatigue:
- Dehydration:
- Excessive hydration, particularly in combination with hypertension, is a known risk factor for immersion pulmonary oedema.
- Motion sickness:
- Menstrual cycle: There is evidence from surveys that there may be a correlation between the stage of the menstrual cycle and the occurrence of decompression illness. The same study indicates the possibility of correlation between the stage of the menstrual cycle with other problems during the dive.
- Medications
- Recreational drug use and substance abuse

== COVID-19 ==
The long term effects of Coronavirus disease 2019 are highly variable in severity, and the effects on fitness to dive will vary from case to case. Many of these effects influence the lungs and cardiovascular system, and therefore may significantly affect risk of diving injury, or the diver's ability to manage an emergency effectively. A review indicated that people who have recovered from COVID-19 had reduced levels of physical function and fitness compared to healthy controls. Recovery of physical functions tends to be incomplete, with some residual impairments present up to 2 years after infection. There is some evidence that combined aerobic and resistance training can improve physical function and fitness after medical recovery, but further research is required to determine the effectiveness of exercise in restoring fitness.

Diving medicine specialists at Divers Alert Network have advised that divers wishing to return to recreational diving after recovering from COVID-19 should wait until they have regained their previous physical fitness, then consult a qualified diving medical practitioner. This process is similar to the compulsory procedure for professional divers for return to diving after illness. The process takes into account the significant number of people who may have had asymptomatic infections, and treats them as if they did not have COVID.

=== Return to diving after COVID-19 ===
The principles behind the DAN protocol for returning to diving activity after COVID-19 are based on risk. The returning diver should not pose a risk of infecting others, and should not be at elevated risk of barotrauma or decompression illness due to damage to the lungs, or be at reduced capacity to manage problems due to cognitive dysfunction or insufficient physical fitness. Aerobic fitness recommendation for commercial divers is 10 Mets, and for recreational divers 6 Mets.

A grading system based on severity of illness is suggested as a guideline (July 2021), with the understanding that individual circumstances may differ, and that this model is subject to revision as and when further data becomes available.

- Grade 0 is people who may or may not have had COVID-19, but if they were infected, did not notice significant symptoms, including those who are identified by screening or diagnostic tests as being infected, but remain asymptomatic. This is about 25% of the people infected. They do not need to undergo any special examination or testing, and can return to diving without restrictions as appropriate to their general health and fitness, provided they are not still infectious. If in doubt, they should remain in precautionary isolation for 14 days.
- Grade 1 (mild), is people who had mild symptoms that did not require medical intervention, and recovered after self-isolation or quarantine. These people may return to diving 2 weeks after full recovery, conditional on passing a diving medical examination, a stress ECG, normal lung function tests and a normal lung X-ray.
- Grade 2 (moderate), is people who has moderate symptoms which required admission to hospital or supplementary oxygen, but not ventilatory support. X-rays do not indicate more than mild abnormality, and no clotting disorders have manifested. These people may return to diving 3 months after recovery subject to passing a diving medical examination, a stress ECG, normal lung function tests and a normal lung X-ray.
- Grade 3 (severe), is people who required admission to intensive care or ventilatory support, or displayed cardiac, neurological or clotting abnormalities, or other complications. These people may return to diving 6 months after recovery subject to passing a diving medical examination, a stress ECG, normal lung function tests, a normal lung X-ray, additional heart tests and a lung CT if indicated. If there are abnormalities, retesting at 12 months is suggested.

The DAN recommendation for diving after vaccination, is not to dive while one is not feeling well in the days after vaccination, to the same extent that one would not dive if not feeling well at any other time.

DAN is conducting research on the long term (5 year) effects of COVID-19 on fitness to dive for recreational scuba and freediving.

The Diving Medical Advisory Council and IMCA have also issued advisory documents on this topic for commercial divers.

== Psychological fitness to dive ==
Psychological fitness has been defined in a military context as "the integration and optimization of mental, emotional, and behavioral abilities and capacities to optimize performance and strengthen resilience". There are other definitions in a self-help/personal growth context, also referred to as emotional or mental fitness, but the military definition is appropriate in the context of the ability to survive and perform in a hostile environment. Psychological fitness to dive is to some extent a characteristic of the person who trains to become a diver, and in recreational diving there is little or no further training, but training for diving in harsher environments and for more demanding tasks often includes elements of training to improve psychological fitness, which allows the diver to better cope with the stresses of emergencies, and in some types of professional diving, the stresses of the job in hand.

Competence, physical health, and fitness are important factors in safe performance, but psychological factors also contribute to human failure or success and should be addressed in the interests of due diligence.

There is little screening for psychological fitness for recreational diving, and not much more for commercial and scientific diving. Technical diving exposes the diver to more unforgiving hazards and higher risks, but it is a recreational activity and to a large extent participation is at the option of the participant.

Psychological profiles indicating intelligence and below average neuroticism tend to correlate with successful diving activity over the long term. These divers tend to be self-sufficient and emotionally stable, and less likely to be involved in accidents unrelated to health problems. Nevertheless, many people with mild neuroses can and do dive with an acceptable safety record. Besides any risks caused by the condition itself, there may be hazards due to the effects of medications taken to manage the condition, either singly or in combination. There are no scientific studies into the safety of diving with most medications, and in most cases the effects of the medication are secondary to the effects of the underlying condition. Drugs with strong effects on moods should be used with care when diving.

A mild state of anxiety can improve performance by making the person more alert and quicker to react, but more severe levels can degrade performance, by narrowing focus and distracting attention, culminating in extreme and debilitating anxiety or panic, where rational response to a developing emergency is lost. A tendency to be generally anxious is known as trait anxiety, as opposed to anxiety brought on by a situation, which is termed state anxiety. Divers who are prone to trait anxiety are more likely to mismanage a developing emergency by panicking and missing the opportunity to recover from the initial incident. Training can help a diver to recognize rising stress levels, and allow them to take corrective action before the situation deteriorates into an injury or fatality. Over-learning appropriate responses to predictable and reasonably foreseeable contingencies allows the diver to react confidently and effectively, which reduces stress as the positive consequences of the appropriate actions are apparent, usually allowing the diver to terminate the dive in a controlled and safe manner.

Statistics from incidents where the circumstances are known implicate panic and inappropriate response in a large proportion of fatalities and near misses. In 1998 the Recreational Scuba Training Council listed "a history of panic disorder" as an absolute contraindication to scuba diving, but the 2001 guideline specifies "a history of untreated panic disorder" as a severe risk condition, which suggests that some people who are being treated for the condition might dive at an acceptable level of risk.

Two personality traits are consistently mentioned across contexts, These are a propensity for adventure or sensation-seeking, and lower trait anxiety than the general population. Both of these characteristics are associated with tolerance to physiological stress and safety implications. Trait anxiety is associated with a tendency to panic, which is implicated in a high proportion of diving incidents, and sensation seeking is associated with risk taking behavior. The current trend in research has moved from describing personality profiles to investigating associations between personality and diving performance.

Some psychological conditions that may affect a person's competence to dive include:

- Affective disorders: Depression and manic depression (bipolar disorder). A condition that reduces a person's ability to make appropriate decisions while diving, particularly when things go wrong, can be a danger to themselves and anyone diving with them who may get involved in the consequences of a poor decision. Conditions that require medication also bring the effects of that medication into the situation, and this applies particularly when the medications alter the mood and affect competence to manage an emergency. A decision whether a person with these conditions can be considered fit to dive must take into account the specifics of the case, including the medications used, the response to the medication over time, and the frequency and severity of incidents.
- Anxiety and phobias, panic disorder. Episodes of panic or near-panic have been implicated in many diving accidents, particularly in recreational diving, and have probably been the cause of diving fatalities. There is evidence that people who have a high level of underlying anxiety are likely to have greater responses to stresses, and these divers will therefore be exposed to greater risk. More than half of divers in a survey reported experiencing at least one panic or near-panic episode while diving. Panic attacks are commonly triggered by an event that a non-diver would consider serious, such as entanglement, an equipment malfunction or being confronted by an unexpected sea creature they may consider dangerous. Such panic attacks can lead to irrational behavior, which can be life-threatening.
  Panic attacks can be experienced by both inexperienced and experienced divers, for no apparent reason. In experienced divers, it is believed that panic occurs because the diver becomes disoriented and experiences sensory deprivation. Inexperienced divers are more likely to panic for a specific reason, such as a loss of breathing gas or an encounter with a shark perceived to be dangerous.
  Panic can occur when the person reacts quickly but irrationally, their attention narrows, and they lose the ability to recognise and select the appropriate available response options. Appropriate training, adequate practice of skills, and attention to the environment can prevent or minimise the occurrence of situations that may trigger panic, and reinforce the ability to respond appropriately to those triggering events which cannot be avoided.
- Narcolepsy: Fitness to dive would depend to some extent on the medication used, response to the medication and possible side-effects. The condition may also affect the safety of other divers who may be affected by a diving accident. A full-face mask may be used to reduce risk of drowning in case of loss of consciousness during a dive.
- Schizophrenia would be considered case by case. Type of medication and response, and how long the person has been free of the disorder would be taken into account, as some people have responded well to medication over the long term. The person's decision making ability, social responsibility and medication side-effects may affect the person's ability to dive safely.
- Substance abuse

=== Recreational diving ===
Recreational diving can have a more beneficial effect on the state of mind of participants than many other physical leisure activities by way of stress reduction and improvement of well-being.

Recreational scuba diving may be considered an extreme sport since personal risk is involved, but it is also a leisure activity conducted for entertainment and relaxation. The diver is free to not dive or to terminate a dive at any time, and to make this physiologically practicable at acceptable risk, there are limitations on the depth, decompression status, and environment in which mainstream recreational diving can take place.

Limited research into the personality characteristics of people choosing to start recreational diving indicate tendencies of self-sufficiency, boldness and impulsiveness (and low scores on conformity, warmth and sensitivity), and are not typical of the personality profiles expected from extreme athletes. Four prevalent personality types were identified, and the results suggested that the risk behavior of the diver would probably depend on the personality type.

Personality types identified were:

- The adventurer, a focused and enthusiastic person who appears easy to get along with, but has a tendency to be competitive and seek attention, and may take risks that endanger themselves and their diving partners.
- The rationalist, an intelligent person with strong control of their emotional life and general behavior, who will conform when the situation requires it, and will generally persist until they have mastered the necessary skills, will comply with rational rules and procedures, and follow the instructions of people who appear to be competent. They are unlikely to take unnecessary risks.
- The dreamer, a person who appears to be unconcerned with everyday matters, or absent minded, and take part in scuba diving as an escape from a bland existence to a more exotic world. Once they recognize the challenges of the activity they may become excessively dependent on the instructor or diving partner and may feel insecure and overwhelmed and frequently seek confirmation of their abilities, which may be annoying.
- The passive-aggressive macho diver, a person who initially presents themselves as friendly and pleasant, but as they integrate with the group, start to display consistently critical attitudes towards anyone who may be conceived of as less expert than themselves, whether or not this is objectively realistic. This has been explained as a defense mechanism to disguise their underlying insecurity and an attempt to boost their low self-esteem.

Motivation to continue diving and to travel to dive: Kler and Tribe (2012) hypothesize and present evidence that a major motivation to pursue diving tourism at considerable expense is the participants gain meaning, fulfillment and long-term satisfaction (eudaimonia) through learning and personal growth from their participation.

For most recreational divers the activity is enjoyable and relaxing. The need to focus on the activities and skills and the tendency to become enthralled by the underwater environment enables divers to leave their worries above the surface.

==== Technical diving ====
Technical diving is the extension of recreational diving to higher risk activities. Technical divers operate in the range of activities that are generally beyond the expected competence of recreational diving, and often beyond the legally acceptable range of risk for professional diving. Military and public safety divers may occasionally be exposed to similar levels of risk in the course of their duties, but this will be for compelling operational reasons, whereas the technical diver chooses to accept these risks in the pursuit of a recreational activity. The risks are managed by the use of specialized equipment, avoidance of single points of failure by teamwork and equipment redundancy, the use of procedures known to be effective, maintenance of a high level of skill, sufficient physical fitness to perform effectively in the expected conditions and any reasonably foreseeable contingency, and appropriate reaction to contingencies. The diver makes an informed assessment of the residual risk and accepts the possible consequences. The way in which a diver reacts to the environment is influenced by attitude, awareness, physical fitness, self-discipline, and the ability to distinguish reality from perception.

In a situation where there is no simple and direct escape to safety, reaction to stress can determine the difference between an enjoyable dive and an accident that may lead to death or disability. If uncontrolled, stress may lead to panic. Overhead environments present challenges and choices where an error may be fatal. Time-pressure stress related to matching gas supply to dive duration can increase when the dive plan is compromised and gas supply runs low, or decompression obligation accumulates beyond the planned limit. When this kind of stress causes the diver to increase gas consumption due to overreacting, the problem gets worse and can spiral into an unrecoverable incident. The ability to react calmly, promptly, and correctly to life-threatening situations, and to persistently and rationally strive to deal effectively with the situation can make the difference between life and death.

=== Military diving ===
Studies of the personality traits of navy divers have indicated that although they operate in a military environment, navy divers tend to be non-conformists.

In a comparison between navy and civilian divers, navy divers scored higher than navy non-divers and civilian divers on calmness and self-control in difficult circumstances and were more emotionally controlled and adventurous, less assertive, more practical, more self-controlled and more likely to follow rules and procedures precisely and work together as a team. The navy divers were found to be willing to accept higher risk, and to have a strong sense of control and acceptance of taking personal responsibility for events.

=== Commercial diving ===
Serious injuries in commercial diving can be extremely costly to the employer, and the working environment can be inherently very hazardous. This is combined with a legislative environment which has a low risk tolerance, so commercial divers need to be selected for the ability to follow best practice procedures reliably and work well as members of a team, as well as the requisite work skills needed to work efficiently and profitably.

== Effects of drugs ==
The use of medical and recreational drugs, can also influence fitness to dive, both for physiological and behavioral reasons. In some cases prescription drug use may have a net positive effect, when effectively treating an underlying condition, but frequently the side effects of effective medication may have undesirable influences on the fitness of diver, and most cases of recreational drug use result in an impaired fitness to dive, and a significantly increased risk of sub-optimal response to emergencies.

=== Prescription and non-prescription medication ===
There are no specific studies that give objective values for the effects and risks of most medications if used while diving, and their interactions with the physiological effects of diving. Any advice given by a medical practitioner is based on educated (to a greater or lesser extent), but unproven assumption, and each case is best evaluated by an expert.

Personality differences between divers will cause each to respond differently to the effects of various breathing gases under pressure and abnormal physiological states. Some of the diving disorders can present symptoms similar to those of psychoneurotic reactions or an organic cerebral syndrome. When considering allowing or barring someone with psychological problems to dive, the certifying physician must be aware of all the possibilities and variations in the specific case.

In many cases an acute illness is best treated in the absence of potential complications caused by diving, but chronic conditions may require medication if the person is to dive at all. Some of the medication types which are commonly or occasionally known to be used by active divers are listed here, along with possible side effects and complications:

Over the counter drugs are generally considered safe for consumer use when the directions for use are followed. They are generally not tested in hyperbaric conditions and may have undesirable side effects, particularly in combination with other drugs.

- Motion sickness is a widespread and potentially debilitating reaction of the central nervous system to conflicting input from the vestibular balance organs of the inner ear and the eyes and other parts of the body. The main symptoms are nausea and confusion.
  - Antihistamines, which include cyclizine, dimenhydrinate, diphenhydramine, and meclizine are the most commonly used medications. They are generally available without a prescription, and have similar side effects, the most common of which is drowsiness, which can adversely affect a diver's situational awareness and reaction speed. There are also other side effects.
  - Promethazine is chemically related to the tranquilizers, and it also has antihistamine properties. It is generally a prescription drug and drowsiness is a significant side effect, and it may significantly impair ability to perform essential tasks under stressful conditions.
  - Trans-dermal scopolamine patch has been reported as effective by many divers, but there are undesirable side effects. Dry mouth effects have been reported, which may be more prevalent in divers breathing dry gas from scuba cylinders. Blurred vision is common, and contact contamination of the eye with the medication will cause pupil dilation. The medication is known to occasionally cause hallucinations, confusion, agitation and disorientation, which are not compatible with safe diving.
  - Phenytoin is an antiepileptic drug which has been shown to be effective against motion sickness, but it has not been approved for the purpose. It is not free of side effects.
  - Tablet form of scopolamine, by prescription
- Malaria is a disease caused by a microorganism carried by mosquitoes. There are several strains and it is widespread in tropical regions. The disease is dangerous and prophylaxis is recommended.
  No interactions between antimalarial drugs and diving have been established, and complications are not generally expected, but the use of Mefloquine is not accepted by all diving medicine specialists.
  Antimalarial drug prophylaxis recommendations depend on specific regions and may change over time. Current recommendations should be checked.
  All of these drugs may have side-effects, and there are known interactions with other drugs. Overdose can be fatal.
  - Mefloquine is seldom reported to have side-effects, but some people are allergic to it. Side effects include nausea, dizziness and disturbed sleep. Occasional serious side effects include seizures, hallucinations and severe anxiety.
  - Doxycycline has side effects of skin sensitization to sunburn, and sometimes upset stomach or yeast infections. It is unsuitable for young children and pregnant women as it can cause staining of developing teeth.
  - Malarone (a combination of atovaquone and proguanil) seldom has side effects, but headache, nausea, vomiting and abdominal pain have been reported. There are contraindications for renal impairment, and it is not recommended in pregnancy or for small children.
  - Chloroquine
  - Hydroxychloroquine sulfate
  - Pyrimethamine
  - Fansidar (sulfadoxine and pyrimethamine)
- Decongestants: Pseudoephedrine has been named in anecdotal reports of possible connections with increased sensitivity to CNS oxygen toxicity. There is a plausible biological mechanism but very little reliable data. The steroid fluticasone propionate and similar medications have been satisfactorily used to treat nasal congestion, but should be used for at least a week before diving to be maximally effective.
- Contraceptives
- Anxiety, phobias & panic disorders
- Diabetes
- Asthma
- Indigestion
- Headaches
- Cardiovascular and hypertension medication;
  - Beta blockers
  - ACE inhibitors (Angiotension-converting enzyme inhibitors)
  - Calcium channel blockers
  - Diuretics
  - Antiarrhythmic agents
  - Anticoagulants
- Schizophrenia
  - Clozapine
  - Quetiapine
  - Risperidone
  - Olanzapine
- Depression: Little research is available on diving or hyperbaric exposure with depression or while taking antidepressants. Reported side effects include anxiety and panic, thought to be caused by interaction with high partial pressure of nitrogen and side effects of the drugs. Restrictions on instructors or divemasters with duty of care to their clients may be more stringent than for recreational divers, though consideration should be given for the possible degradation of the buddy system. Some antidepressants are known to increase risk of seizure but no data is available on whether they increase sensitivity to CNS oxygen toxicity.
  - Selective serotonin reuptake inhibitors: SSRIs tend to be more expensive than other antidepressant medications, but are relatively safer for divers. However they do have typical side effects, such as drowsiness, which can affect dive safety. Other side effects may include increased susceptibility to bruising and bleeding, which can increase the apparent severity of injuries. Combined effects with other medications like anti-platelet drugs and non-steroidal anti-inflammatories, (such as aspirin or ibuprofen), can further exacerbate bleeding. In higher doses SSRIs may cause seizures, with the associated high risk of drowning if they occur underwater.
  - Monoamine oxidase inhibitors: MOAIs can cause dizziness from orthostatic hypotension and drowsiness. Side effects at increased partial pressure of nitrogen are unclear. In combination with some other medications they can cause increased blood pressure, and they should not be take with some types of aged or fermented foods which contain the amino acid tyramine which can cause a hypertensive crisis.
  - Tricyclics, tetracyclics, heterocyclics: TCAs and HCAs can have side effects of dizziness, drowsiness, and blurred vision, which are not compatible with safe diving if they impair concentration, alertness or decision-making.
  - bupropion, trazodone and venlafaxine may lower the seizure threshold. Venlafaxine may occasionally cause fainting, excitability and difficulty breathing. Bupropion may cause agitation, CNS stimulation, seizures, psychosis, dry mouth, headache, migraine, nausea, vomiting, rash, tinnitus, muscle pain and dizziness.
- Anti-inflammatories and analgesics may be acceptable, subject to some known side effects, sensitivities, interactions and contraindications. These drugs are commonly taken for temporary relief of minor aches and pains, and the underlying condition may still be present. They may mask symptoms of mild decompression sickness, which may delay treatment. Naproxen sodium and ibuprofen may produce side effects such as heartburn, nausea, abdominal pain, headache, dizziness and drowsiness, and they are usually discouraged for people with disorders involving heartburn, gastric ulcers, bleeding problems or asthma. There may be adverse drug interactions with anticoagulants, insulin and nonsteroidal anti-inflammatories.
  - Aspirin
  - Diclofenac (Voltaren)
  - Ibuprofen
  - Ketoprofen
  - Naproxen
  - Paracetamol (Acetaminophen)

=== Recreational drugs and substance abuse ===
- Smoking (tobacco)
- Alcohol: Although alcohol consumption increases dehydration and therefore may increase susceptibility to DCS, a 2005 study found no evidence that alcohol consumption increases the incidence of DCS.
  - Alcohol may also increase risk by affecting reaction time, visual tracking, attention, ability to multitask, perception and judgement and performance of psychomotor tasks.
- Cannabis may cause side effects that could increase risk when diving, including:
  - Dizziness is a fairly common side effect, which may reduce with continued use.
  - Headache, constipation, nervousness, fatigue, insomnia, limb or abdominal pain, and weight loss are less common side effects.
  - These impairments may not be apparent to the user, which makes the risk greater.

== See also ==
- Rubicon Foundation – American non-profit foundation
- Undersea and Hyperbaric Medical Society – US based hyperbaric research organization
- Diving Medical Advisory Council – Independent organisation of diving medical specialists from Northern Europe
