= Neal W. Pollock =

Canadian researcher in diving physiology and hyperbaric medicine

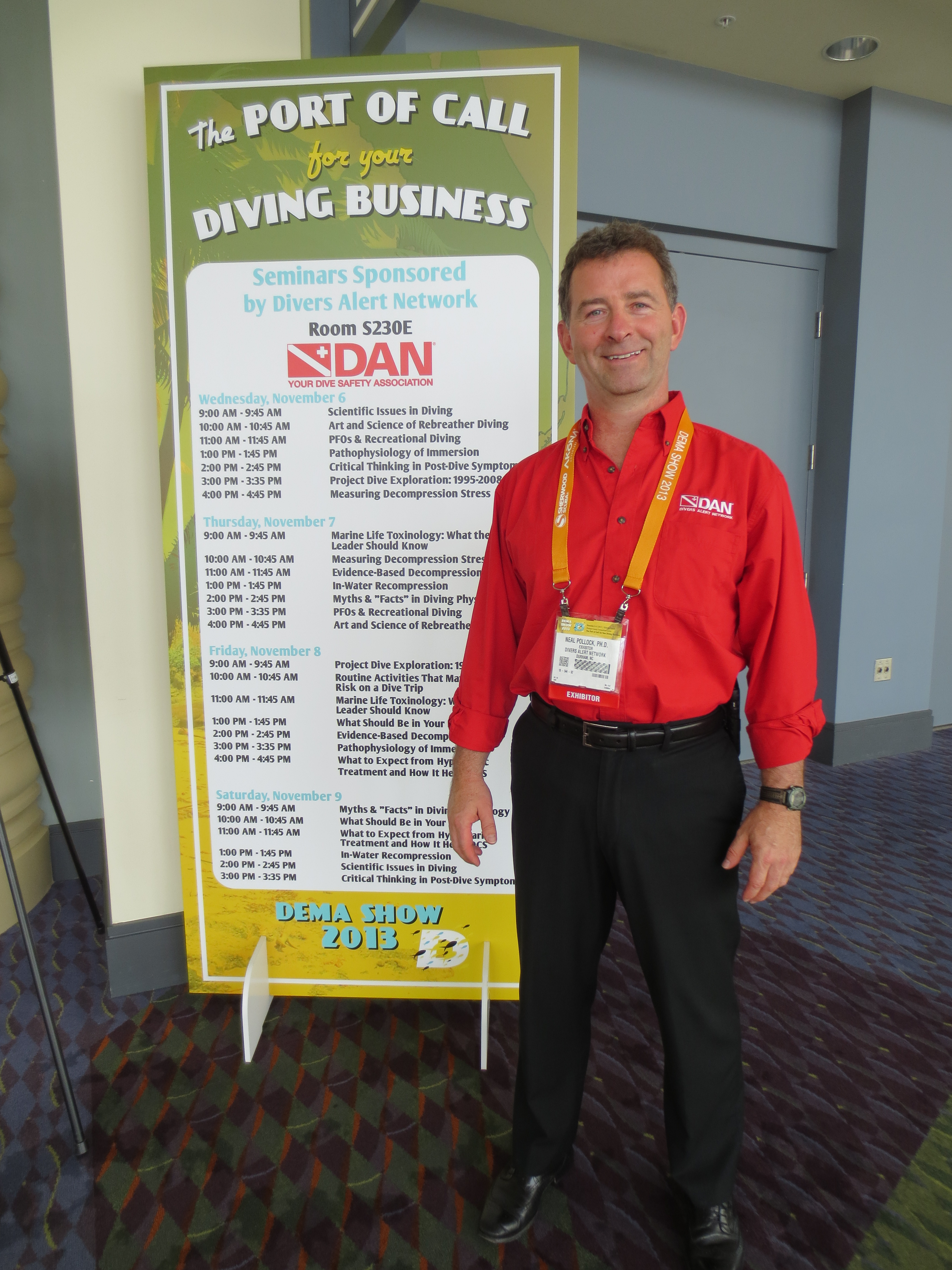
Pollock before speaking at the 2013 DEMA Show

Neal Pollock is a Canadian academic and diver. Born in Edmonton, Canada he completed a bachelor's degree in zoology; the first three years at University of Alberta and the final year at the University of British Columbia. After completing a master's degree he then served as diving officer at University of British Columbia for almost five years. He then moved to Florida and completed a doctorate in exercise physiology/environmental physiology at Florida State University.

== Positions ==
Pollock is the Research Chair in Hyperbaric and Diving Medicine at Laval University, Quebec . He also serves as an Associate Professor in the Department of Kinesiology, School of Medicine. The Chair position is possibly the first of its kind in North America. The purpose is to provide overarching support and promotion of hyperbaric and diving medicine.

Prior to this move in November 2016 Pollock was Research Director at Divers Alert Network, a Senior Research Associate at the Center for Hyperbaric Medicine and Environmental Physiology at Duke University Medical Center, a member of the Board of the American Academy of Underwater Sciences Foundation, a member of the Advisory Board of Divewise, chair of the International Breath Hold Blackout Task Force, and a member of Editorial Board of the journal Diving and Hyperbaric Medicine.

His academic training is in zoology/marine science, exercise physiology and environmental physiology; his research interests focus on human health and safety in extreme environments. Pollocck developed and maintains a breath-hold incident database for DAN that includes cases from 2004 forward. Summaries and case reports have appeared in DAN annual reports since 2005 and a variety of other publications. Pollock co-organised and edited the proceedings of the 2005 Undersea and Hyperbaric Medical Society / Divers Alert Network 'Diabetes and Recreational Diving: Guidelines For The Future Workshop. He co-chaired the Undersea and Hyperbaric Medical Society / Divers Alert Network 2006 breath-hold workshop and co-edited the proceedings published from that meeting, and was part of organising team behind the 2012 international safety symposium; Rebreather Forum 3 and co-edited the subsequent proceedings.

Pollock is a member of the 'Diver Medical Screen Committee ' (DMSC). This team of internationally respected diving medicine experts - Dr Nick Bird, Dr Oliver Firth, (the late) Professor Tony Frew, Dr Alessandro Marroni, Professor Simon Mitchell and Dr Adel Taher, revised the 'RSTC Diver Medical Declaration Form' and associated 'Notes for Physicians'. The process took three years and it was published in June 2020. The previous document dated from 1989.

== Works ==
- Pollock, Neal W (2015) Radio Interview - 'How Gradient Factors, Thermal Factors And Heated Devices Affect Decompression Stress In Diving' At: Beneath The Sea, New York
- Pollock, Neal W (2014) A Quick And Dirty Review Of Gradient Factors At: EUROTEK Advanced Diving Conference, Birmingham, England
- Neal W Pollock (2014). "Thermal Stress - Thermal Physiology and Protection for diving" (PDF). XRay Magazine.
- Vann RD; Denoble PJ; Pollock NW, eds. (2014). Rebreather Forum 3 Proceedings. AAUS / DAN / PADI: Durham, North Carolina (PDF) (Report).
- Pollock, Neal W (2013). "Temperature Drop". DIVER (UK) Magazine.
- Foster, Philip P.; Pollock, Neal W.; Conkin, Johnny; Dervay, Joseph P.; Caillot, Nicolas; Chhikara, Raj S.; Vann, Richard D.; Butler, Bruce D.; Gernhardt, Michael L. (2013). "Protective Mechanisms in Hypobaric Decompression". Aviation, Space, and Environmental Medicine. 84 (3): 212–224(14). doi:10.3357/asem.3314.2013. PMID 23513282.
- Zanchi J, Ljubkovic M, Denoble PJ, Dujic Z, Ranapurwala S, Pollock NW (2013). "[abstract] Influence of Repeated Daily Diving on Decompression Stress". Int J Sports Med. 35 (6): 465–8. doi:10.1055/s-0033-1334968. PMID 23771833.
- Lunn Rosemary E, Pollock Neal W (2013). "Update on Rebreather Forum 3" (PDF). Wound Care Hyperbaric Medicine. In: 4(3): 17-9
- Pollock, Neal W (2013). "Acclimatization - Understanding the influence of repeated daily diving on decompression stress". Alert Diver Online.
- Neal W. Pollock; Michael R. Dardeau (2013). "Why is scientific diving safer? Review of decompression illness in 10 years of scientific diving" (PDF). XRay Magazine (52): 65–67. In: 2013 January 10
- Pollock, Neal W (2012) Thermal Physiology and Protection - Part one and Thermal Physiology and Protection - Part two At: Rebreather Forum 3, Friday 18 May 2012
- Sheldrake, Sean; Pollock, Neal W. "Alcohol and Diving". In: Steller D, Lobel L, eds. Diving for Science 2012. Proceedings of the American Academy of Underwater Sciences 31st Symposium. Dauphin Island, AL: AAUS; 2012.
- Pollock, Neal W (2012). "What is Rebreather Forum 3 All About?". In Alert Diver Online
- Thom, SR; Milovanova, TN; Bogush, M; Bhopale, VM; Yang, M; Bushmann, K; Pollock, NW; Ljubkovic, M; Denoble, P; Dujic, Z (Apr 2012). "Microparticle production, neutrophil activation, and intravascular bubbles following open-water SCUBA diving". Journal of Applied Physiology. 112 (8): 1268–78. doi:10.1152/japplphysiol.01305.2011. PMID 22323646. S2CID 11475127.
- S K Hooker; A Fahlman; M J Moore; N Aguilar de Soto; Y Bernaldo de Quirós; A O Brubakk; D P Costa; A M Costidis; S Dennison; K J Falke; A Fernandez; M Ferrigno; J R Fitz-Clarke; M M Garner; D S Houser; P D Jepson; D R Ketten; P H Kvadsheim; P T Madsen; N W Pollock; D S Rotstein; T K Rowles; S E Simmons; W Van Bonn; P K Weathersby; M J Weise; T M Williams; P L Tyack (2012). "Deadly diving? Physiological and behavioural management of decompression stress in diving mammals". Proceedings of the Royal Society B: Biological Sciences. 279 (1731): 1041–1050. doi:10.1098/rspb.2011.2088. PMC 3267154. PMID 22189402.
- Pollock, Neal W (2011) Assessment of Decompression Exposure At: International Congress on Hyperbaric Medicine, South Africa
- Pollock, Neal W (2011) Ultrasonography In Aerospace, Diving And Hyperbaric Medicine At: International Congress on Hyperbaric Medicine, South Africa
- Neal W. Pollock; Michael J. Natoli (2010). "Chemical Oxygen Generation: Evaluation of the Green Dot Systems, Inc Portable, Nonpressurized emOx Device". Wilderness & Environmental Medicine. 21 (3): 244–249. doi:10.1016/j.wem.2010.04.008. PMID 20832702.
- Pollock, Neal W (2009) "Diving Dry - Thermal protection for extreme conditions". In Alert Diver Online
- Wester TE, Cherry AD, Pollock NW, Freiberger JJ, Natoli MJ, Schinazi EA, Doar PO, Boso AE, Alford EL, Walker AJ, Uguccioni DM, Kernagis D, Moon RE (2009). "Effects of head and body cooling on hemodynamics during immersed prone exercise at 1ATA". Journal of Applied Physiology. 106 (2): 691–700. doi:10.1152/japplphysiol.91237.2008. PMID 19023017. S2CID 13339293.
- A. D. Cherry; I. F. Forkner; H. J. Frederick; M. J. Natoli; E. A. Schinazi; J. P. Longphre; J. L. Conard; W. D. White; J. J. Freiberger; B. W. Stolp; N. W. Pollock; P. O. Doar (2009). "Predictors of increased PaCO2 during immersed prone exercise at 4.7 ATA". Journal of Applied Physiology. 106 (1): 316–325 DOI: 10.1152/japplphysiol.00885.2007. doi:10.1152/japplphysiol.00885.2007. PMID 18787095. S2CID 17115583.
- Pollock, Neal W (2008). "Developing a Training Program for Scientific Diving Environmental Health and Safety Professionals". Proceedings of the American Academy of Underwater Sciences 27th Symposium.Dauphin Island: 121–127.
- Brueggeman P, Pollock Neal W, eds. Diving for Science 2008. Proceedings of the American Academy of Underwater Sciences 27th Symposium. Dauphin Island, AL: AAUS
- Pollock, Neal W (2007). "Use of Ultrasound in decompression research". Diving and Hyperbaric Medicine. 37: 68–72.
- Pollock, Neal W (2007). "Aerobic fitness and underwater diving" (PDF). Diving and Hyperbaric Medicine. 37: 118–124. Archived from the original on March 3, 2016.
- Pollock, Neal W (2007). "Scientific diving in Antarctica: history and current practice". Diving and Hyperbaric Medicine. 37: 204–11.
- Pollock, Neal W (2007). "Evolving Standards for Diabetes and Diving: Implications for Scientific Diving". Proceedings of the American Academy of Underwater Sciences 25th Symposium: 25–37.
- Pollock, Neal W (2006). "Flying After Diving" (PDF). Wilderness Medicine. 23: 28.
- Lindholm P, Pollock NW, Lundgren CEG (2006). Breath-hold diving. Proceedings of the Undersea and Hyperbaric Medical Society/Divers Alert Network 2006 June 20–21 Workshop.. Durham, NC, United States: Divers Alert Network. ISBN 978-1-930536-36-4.
- Pollock NW, Uguccioni DM, Dear GdeL, eds. (2005) "Guidelines to Diabetes & Recreational Diving". In: Proceedings of the Undersea and Hyperbaric Medical Society / Divers Alert Network 2005 June 19 Workshop. Durham, NC: Divers Alert Network; 2005.
- Vann RD, Pollock NW, Pieper CF, Murdoch DR, Muza SR, Natoli MJ, Wang LY (2005). "[Abstract] Statistical models of acute mountain sickness". High Alt Med Biol. 6 (1): 32–42. doi:10.1089/ham.2005.6.32. PMID 15772498. S2CID 24320351. In: 2005 Spring; 6(1):32-42.
- G de L Dear; N W Pollock; D M Uguccioni; J Dovenbarger; M N Feinglos; R E Moon (2004). "Plasma glucose responses in recreational divers with insulin-requiring diabetes". Undersea & Hyperbaric Medicine. 31 (3).
- Pollock, NW; Natoli, MJ; Gerth, WA; Thalmann, ED; Vann, RD (Nov 2003). "Risk of decompression sickness during exposure to high cabin altitude after diving". Aviat Space Environ Med. 74 (11): 1163–1168. PMID 14620473.
- Natoli, MJ; Hobbs, GW; Pollock, NW; Stolp, BW; Corkey, WB; Gabrielova, I; Hendricks, DM; Schinazi, EA; Almon, AK; Pieper, CF; Vann, RD (2000). "[Abstract] Oxygen Enhanced Breath-Hold: Immersion and Temperature Effects".
- Pollock, Neal W; Hobbs, Gene W; Natoli, Michael J; Hendricks, David M; Gabrielova, Ivana; Delphia, Bruce C; Vann, Richard D (2000). "REMO2: an O2 rebreather for use in emergency medical applications". Wilderness Environ Med. 11 (1): 60.
- Pollock, NW; Natoli, MJ; Hobbs, Gene W; Smith, RT; Winkler, PM; Hendricks, DM; Mutzbauer, TS; Muller, PHJ et al. (1999). "Testing and evaluation of the Divers Alert Network closed-circuit oxygen breathing apparatus (REMO2)". Divers Alert Network Technical Report.
- Neal W. Pollock, Richard D. Vann, Edward D. Thalmann and Claus EG Lundgren. (1997). "Oxygen-Enhanced Breath-hold Diving, Phase I: Hyperventilation and Carbon Dioxide Elimination". In: EJ Maney Jr and CH Ellis Jr (Eds.) Diving for Science...1997. Proceedings of the American Academy of Underwater Sciences (17th Annual Scientific Diving Symposium).
- Neal William Pollock (1996). "Peripheral and whole-body cold acclimatization in Antarctic scuba divers". Dissertation: Thesis (Ph.D.) - the Florida State University. OCLC 224277268.
- Pollock, NW; Bower SS (1995). "Scuba collection of benthic foraminifera in Explorers Cove, Antarctica: An accessible model of the deep-ocean benthos". Diving for Science: 63–74. Archived from the original on March 4, 2016.
- Vann, RD; Gerth, WA; Southerland, DG; Stanton, GR; Pollock, NW; Kepper, W; Heinmiller, P (1992). "[abstract] No-Stop Repetitive N2/02 Diving With Surface Interval 02 (SI02): PHASE II". Undersea and Hyperbaric Medical Society, Inc. Annual Scientific Meeting Held June 22–27, 1992. Archived from the original on December 26, 2013.
- Pollock, Neal William (1988). The contribution of elevated peripheral tissue temperature to venous gas emboli (VGE) formation. Dissertation: Thesis (Master of Arts - MA) - University of British Columbia, Vancouver, Canada (Thesis). doi:10.14288/1.0077397.

== Quotes ==
- Neal W Pollock (2013). "You cannot avoid risk, you just need to manage it". Punch Business.com.

== Awards ==
- UHMS Craig Hoffman Memorial / Charles W. Shilling Award (For outstanding contribution to teaching, education and / or diving safety), June 2015
- SSI Platinum Pro Diver Award, November 2014
- EUROTEK.2014 Publication Award, Vann RD, Denoble PJ, Pollock NW (2014). Rebreather Forum 3 Proceedings. AAUS / DAN / PADI: Durham, North Carolina (PDF) (Report).
- AAUS Service Recognition Award (2007 - 2012 BOD Service), American Academy of Underwater Sciences, September 2012
- Johnson Space Center Group Achievement Award, National Aeronautics and Space Administration, September 2011
- Peer Reviewer Recognition Award, Wilderness and Environmental Medicine, June 2010
