= Gene Hobbs =

American technical diver and co-founder of the Rubicon Foundation

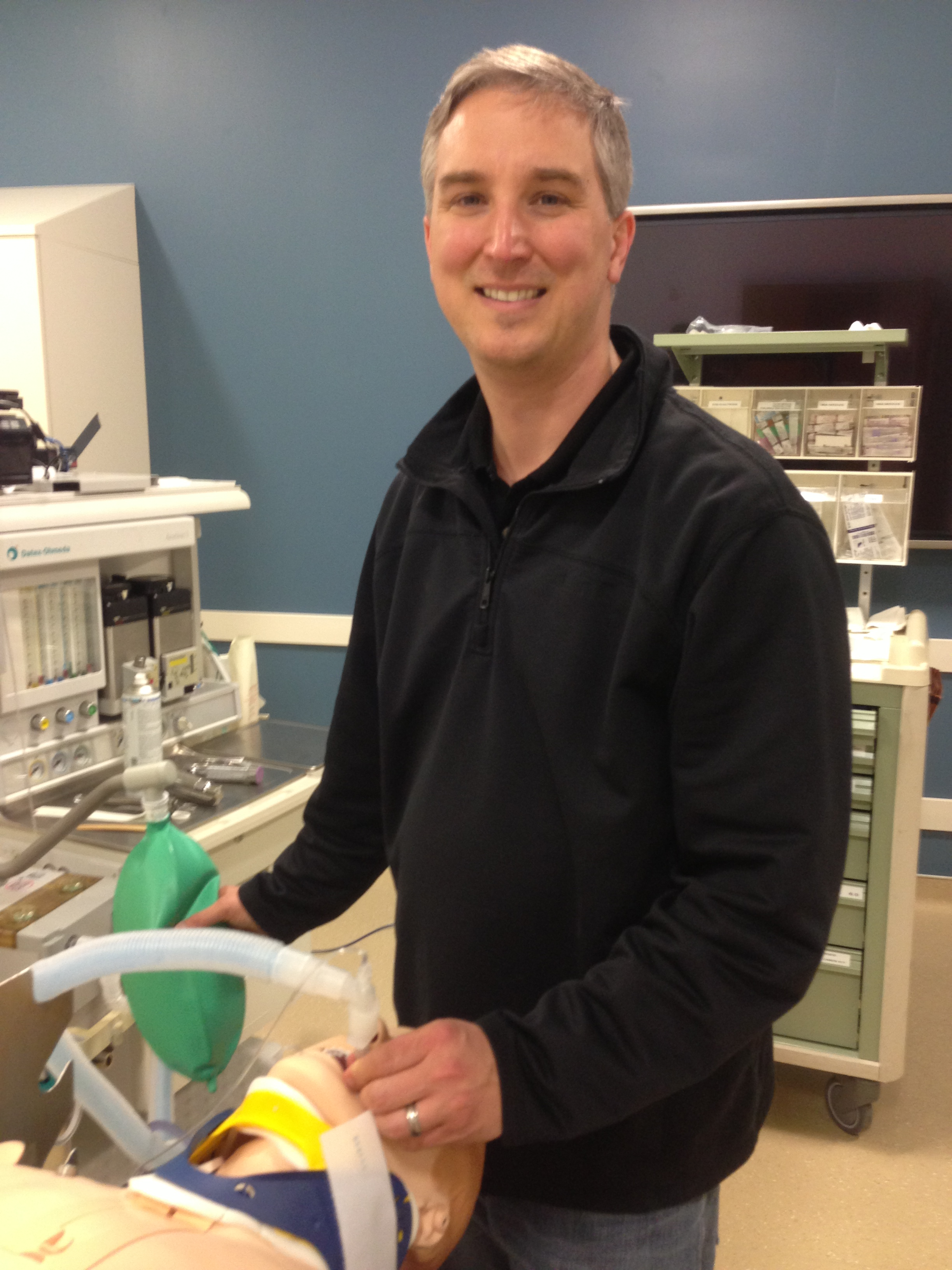
- Gene Hobbs at work testing a medical simulator
- Born: November 28, 1973 (age 52); Fayetteville, North Carolina, U.S.
- Occupations: medical simulation, healthcare administration, Adjunct professor, Certified Hyperbaric Technologist, technical diver

Eugene Weston Hobbs II, known as Gene Hobbs (born November 28, 1973) is an American technical diver and founding board member of the non-profit Rubicon Foundation. Hobbs has served as medical officer for the Woodville Karst Plain Project since 2004 and was named the 2010 Divers Alert Network/ Rolex Diver of the year. Hobbs was a hyperbaric technologist and simulation coordinator at Duke Medical Center before taking a position as the Director of Simulation for the University of North Carolina School of Medicine and Clinical Instructor in the Department of Pediatrics. As of 2018, Hobbs is the business manager for the UNC Health Care Department of Neurosurgery.

== Early life and education ==
Hobbs was born on November 28, 1973, in Fayetteville, North Carolina, where he attended Terry Sanford High School and graduated in 1992. He then attended the North Carolina State University (NCSU) where he majored in business management with a human resources concentration. While in college, Hobbs began volunteering at the F.G. Hall Hyperbaric Laboratory at Duke University Medical Center. Hobbs became a Certified Hyperbaric Technologist in 1997. He was awarded credentials as a Certified Healthcare Simulation Educator in 2015.

Hobbs earned an MBA with a concentration in healthcare from Fayetteville State University in 2020. Hobbs went on to complete a graduate certificate in cybersecurity management from Fayetteville State University in 2023.

In 2025, Hobbs earned a doctoral degree in Educational leadership from the East Carolina University College of Education. His dissertation focused on empathy training by applying simulation methods in an undergraduate business student population.

== Diving and hyperbaric ==
Hobbs was certified in scuba diving by H. Larry Brown at NCSU in 1993. Following this first class, he began assisting the diving classes while continuing his diving education. Hobbs was certified as a cave diver and NAUI instructor in 1997.

At the Duke F.G. Hall Lab in 1997, Hobbs worked on a project to evaluate emergency oxygen rebreathers for use in the delivery of first aid oxygen to diving accident victims. This work culminated in the testing of Hobbs' prototype and subsequent marketing of the Remote Emergency Oxygen Delivery System (REMO2) by the Divers Alert Network (DAN) from January 1999 – August 2001. This product was introduced at the Med-Trade convention and named the 1999 "Med-Trade new product of the year" however problems with manufacturing capability ended the project.

Hobbs participated in other projects related to aging divers, breath-hold diving, and extra-vehicular activity. Hobbs serves as a member of the Undersea and Hyperbaric Medical Society diving committee that shapes guidance related to diving medical safety.

Education in hyperbaric medicine related topics via inter-institutional simulations has allowed Hobbs to tie his passion for diving with his career in medical training.

Hobbs has made significant regular contributions to Wikipedia's scuba diving articles, particularly to their referencing. He was joint author of a 2009 article advocating participation in Wikipedia as a means of increasing awareness of diving medicine.

=== Woodville Karst Plain Project ===
Hobbs has served as medical officer for the Woodville Karst Plain Project since 2004. From this position, he has supported the medical communication and logistics for the team's divers.

== Simulation ==
Hobbs began working as the Medical Simulation Coordinator for Duke University Medical Center's Human Simulation and Patient Safety Center in 2001. Here his role in a young field involved development of resources for the program, curriculum development, and establishing the role he would provide within this new field.

In 2007, Hobbs was part of the development team for a first person video game called 3DiTeams out of a collaboration between Duke University Medical Center and Virtual Heroes, Inc. and used for medical education and team training. The project was unveiled to the general public in a workshop entitled "3DiTeams – Team Training in a Virtual Interactive Environment" hosted by the American Society of Anesthesiologists Annual Meeting in San Francisco, California, on October 16, 2007.

Their team has continued to develop and test new training and assessment methods for healthcare providers and research personnel.

In 2014, Hobbs joined the faculty at the University of North Carolina School of Medicine as Director of Simulation and Clinical Instructor in the Department of Pediatrics. His role at UNC has involved patient safety projects as well as development of unique educational opportunities. The quality improvement and patient safety initiatives include simulations for health system wide TeamSTEPPS and Code Sepsis projects as well as more specific work with postpartum hemorrhage and trauma.

Work with interprofessional teams is one area in which he has continued to specialize. In 2016, their team collaboration with North Carolina State University College of Veterinary Medicine was recognized by the Association of American Veterinary Medical Colleges (AAVMC) and Association for Prevention Teaching and Research when the team's One Health case submission was selected in a national competition. Hobbs advocates for the use of standardized patients to portray other team members or having other clinicians as faculty if interprofessional learners are not an option.

In addition to his role in graduate medical education, Hobbs also created a course for UNC undergraduate students to participate in simulation activities throughout the health system.

Hobbs authored a book chapter on the role of a simulation operations specialist in research that was published in 2016. In 2017, the UNC Anesthesia team including Hobbs was awarded the "First Place Research Abstract at the 17th Annual International Meeting on Simulation in Healthcare". He received a plaque recognizing his "contributions and service" to the Society for Simulation in Healthcare and Simulation Operations and Technology Section in 2018.

Hobbs left his simulation director role in 2017 to take on a role as business manager for the UNC Health Care Department of Neurosurgery. In addition to the day-to-day operations of the Department of Neurosurgery, Hobbs serves on a committee providing oversight their educational laboratory focused primarily on cadaveric and task oriented simulation training. He also began blogging in the Society for Human Resource Management Blog in 2017 and concentrates his posts on simulation, workplace safety, and workforce accommodations.

== Rubicon Foundation ==
In 2002, Hobbs joined with divers Brian Armstrong and James Wagner in the formation of the Rubicon Foundation to further diving education, research and conservation efforts. The first major project Rubicon started was the Rubicon Research Repository created to aggregate often hard to find literature in the fields of diving and hyperbaric medicine. This included scanning creation of metadata for many documents that were not indexed in any database as well as negotiation of copyright permissions with the organizations to make these items available to the public. Hobbs received a "Special Achievement Award" from the Undersea and Hyperbaric Medical Society for his creation of the Rubicon Research Repository in June 2005. This work has continued and grown in their effort to create greater communication and collaboration between the diving medical community and divers.

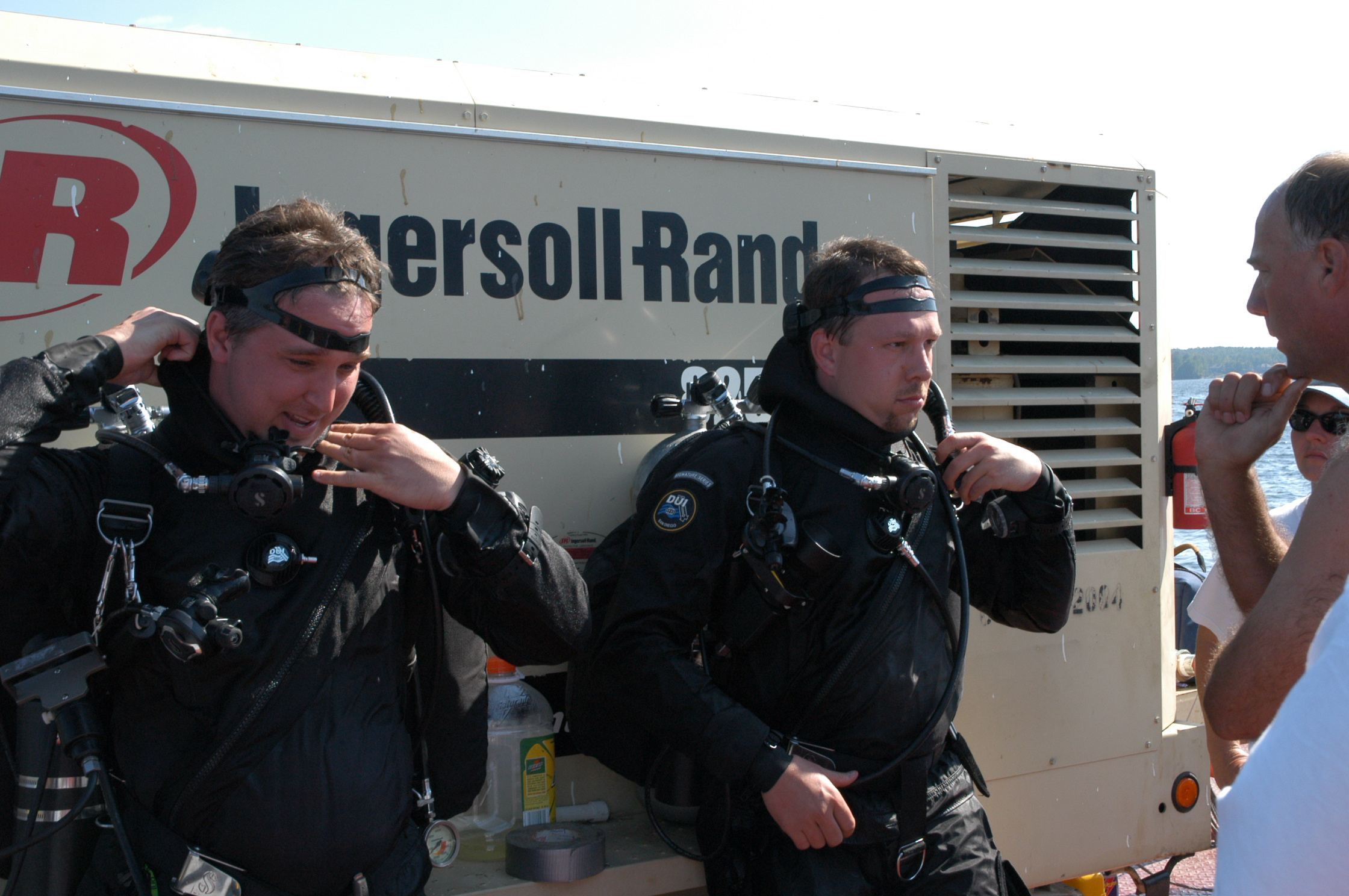
Divers Gene Hobbs and Brian Armstrong debrief following dive for the B25 recovery project

Dr. Simon Mitchell has recognized Hobbs "alongside Dick Clarke as CHTs who have made spectacular contributions to the field". As a result of his work with the Rubicon Research Repository, Hobbs was named the 2010 Divers Alert Network/ Rolex Diver of the year. This was the 22nd time this award has been presented to someone that has "contributed significantly to dive safety or the DAN mission". Later that year, Hobbs began diving a rebreather having completed his training with Gregg Stanton.

The B-25c Mitchell bomber was ditched on 4 April 1943 and remained 45 metres (148 ft) below the surface of Lake Murray (South Carolina) for 60 years. The recovery effort was headed by Dr. Robert Seigler and supervised by Gary Larkins of the Air Pirates. Hobbs participated in the recovery effort with divers from Association of Underwater Explorers (AUE), the Rubicon Foundation, and Woodville Karst Plain Project in 2005. The project was documented by the History Channel and televised on their show Mega Movers. The plane is being preserved by the Southern Museum of Flight in Birmingham, Alabama.

Hobbs teamed up with Keith Gault of the United States Navy Experimental Diving Unit to apply probabilistic models developed by Dr Wayne Gerth to the understanding of problems facing the technical diving population. This project is ongoing and included various breathing gases and decompression styles.

In 2010, Rubicon started Project Pink Tank with a goal to improve the knowledge available to breast cancer survivors about their engagement in scuba diving. The methods applied for this project will also influence further diving medical research.

== Personal life ==
Hobbs met his wife Becky while working in the Human Simulation and Patient Safety Center and they were married at Anse Chastanet in October 2004.

In 2009, Hobbs and his wife lost their son Andrew who was born with a congenital diaphragmatic hernia after thirty days. Their second son was born in 2011. They currently reside in Pittsboro, North Carolina.
