= Divers Alert Network =

Group for improving diving safety

International Divers Alert Network
- Abbreviation: IDAN
- Purpose: Scuba diving safety
- Headquarters: Durham, North Carolina
- Location(s): 6 West Colony Place Durham, NC 27705 United States
- Region served: Worldwide, in cooperation with associates.: DAN Asia Pacific; DAN Brasil; DAN Europe; DAN Japan; DAN Southern Africa

Divers Alert Network (DAN) is a group of not-for-profit organizations dedicated to improving diving safety for all divers. It was founded in Durham, North Carolina, United States, in 1980 at Duke University providing 24/7 telephonic hot-line diving medical assistance. Since then the organization has expanded globally and now has independent regional organizations in North America, Europe, Japan, Asia-Pacific and Southern Africa.

The DAN group of organizations provide similar services, some only to members, and others to any person on request. Member services usually include a diving accident hot-line, and diving accident and travel insurance. Services to the general public usually include diving medical advice and training in first aid for diving accidents. DAN America and DAN Europe maintain databases on diving accidents, treatment and fatalities, and crowd-sourced databases on dive profiles uploaded by volunteers which are used for ongoing research programmes. They publish research results and collaborate with other organizations on projects of common interest.

== Function ==
DAN has an international network of emergency call centers which operate 24 hours a day to provide members with specialized assistance for diving emergencies from a group of experts in Diving and Hyperbaric Medicine

== History ==
In 1977, Undersea Medical Society (later the Undersea and Hyperbaric Medical Society) introduced the concept of a national organization (to replace LEO-FAST at Brooks Air Force Base, directed by Colonel Jefferson Davis, M.D.) where a diving medicine specialist could be contacted by telephone 24 hours a day. Peter B. Bennett received a two-year grant from National Oceanic and Atmospheric Administration and National Institute for Occupational Safety and Health in September 1980 to form the "National Diving Accident Network" at the Frank G. Hall Hyperbaric Center at Duke University Medical Center in Durham, North Carolina.

In 1981, DAN published its "Underwater Diving Accident Manual". The Hyperbaric Center received 305 calls for information and assistance. DAN implemented a medical/safety advisory telephone line to handle questions from recreational divers with non-emergency questions in 1982. This change was followed by a name change from "Diving Accident Network" to "Divers Alert Network" and hosted the first annual Diving Accident and Hyperbaric Treatment continuing medical education course at the Duke University Medical Center.

In 1983 International Diving Assistance, later to become DAN Europe, was founded by Alessandro Marroni as a 24-hour per day diving emergency assistance service, set up as a membership organization, with specific insurance benefits since the start.

In 1984, federal grant monies were decreased (50 percent in 1982 and then by 25 percent in 1983) and support now comes exclusively from divers and the diving industry.

In 1985 DAN started a 'sponsor program' for clubs, stores and corporations,

In 1987 the Civil Alert Network (CAN) began assisting diving emergencies in Japan, under the guidance of prof. Yoshihiro Mano of the University of Tokyo Medical School. This would become DAN Japan. Also in 1987, DAN started the first dive accident insurance program for members. After the introduction of this program the membership numbers doubled to 32,000 in 1988.

The IRS granted DAN its 501(c)(3) non-profit status in 1990. The organization continues to be associated with Duke University Medical Center, but moved its offices from the Frank G. Hall Labs to off campus office space. In 1991 DAN introduced its first training course 'Oxygen First aid Training Program' and DAN Travel Assist. In the same year the 'Flying After Diving' research trials began.

The need for an international organisation that would be available to all divers, wherever they dived around the world, became increasingly apparent and, during a meeting at DAN Headquarters in Durham, N.C., US, in February 1991, the process to form an International DAN was started. The four existing organisations decided to adopt the common name of DAN. and International DAN – also known as IDAN – was established to support the regional IDAN members - DAN America, DAN Europe, DAN Japan, and DAN Asia-Pacific.

In 1992 Emergency medical evacuation, was added as a member benefit, and DAN was awarded the Undersea and Hyperbaric Medical Society's Craig Hoffman Diving Safety Award in June of that year for its significant contributions to the health and safety of recreational divers. In September the first DAN Instructor Training Workshop was held, and the Oxygen First Aid Training program was introduced to Europe.

1993 saw DAN open an insurance company 'Accident General Insurance'.

Dan Asia Pacific was founded in 1994 under the name DAN Australia by Australian diver, John Lippmann OAM, after dual approaches from DAN America and John Williamson of the Australian Diver Emergency Service to "establish a DAN entity in the Asia-Pacific."

DAN Southern Africa joined the IDAN in 1996 with Frans Cronjé, M.D. as CEO By 1996 Oxygen First Aid Training was being taught in seven continents.

DAN introduced other diving related first aid training courses – 'Oxygen first aid for aquatic emergencies' (1998), 'Remote Oxygen (REMO2) (1999), Hazardous Marine Life Injuries (2000), Automatic External Difibrillation (2001) and Advanced Oxygen Provider (2002). DAN moved to its new, permanent headquarters, the Peter B. Bennett Center.

Bennett received the 2002 Diving Equipment and Marketing Association Reaching Out Award for his contribution to the dive industry and the Carolinas' Ernst and Young Entrepreneur of the Year 2002 award for contributions to business in the life sciences. He announced his retirement as DAN President effective June 30, 2003 After Bennett resigned as DAN President and CEO, DAN Executive Vice President and Chief Operating Officer Dan Orr, MS was named acting president and CEO. DAN established the Peter B. Bennett Research Fund, within the Endowment Fund to support research initiatives, enhancing dive safety into the future.

In 2004, Michael D. Curley, Ph.D. was named DAN America President and CEO. In 2006, Curley stepped down and Mr. Orr was named as the DAN President and CEO. In February 2009, DAN launched a web site for their bi-monthly magazine "Alert Diver Online".

DAN reported membership numbers worldwide for 2019 as: DAN US/Canada, 274,708; DAN Europe, 123,680; DAN Japan, 18,137; DAN World Asia Pacific, 12,163; DAN World Latin America/Brazil, 8,008; DAN Southern Africa, 5,894.

== IDAN ==
International DAN (IDAN) comprises independently administered nonprofit DAN organizations based around the world that provide expert emergency medical and referral services to regional diving communities. Each DAN depends on the support of the divers of its region to provide its safety and educational services, and may provide locally appropriate insurance options. They operate under protocol standards set by the IDAN Headquarters.

DAN (America) serves as the headquarters for IDAN.

== DAN America ==
Divers Alert Network America
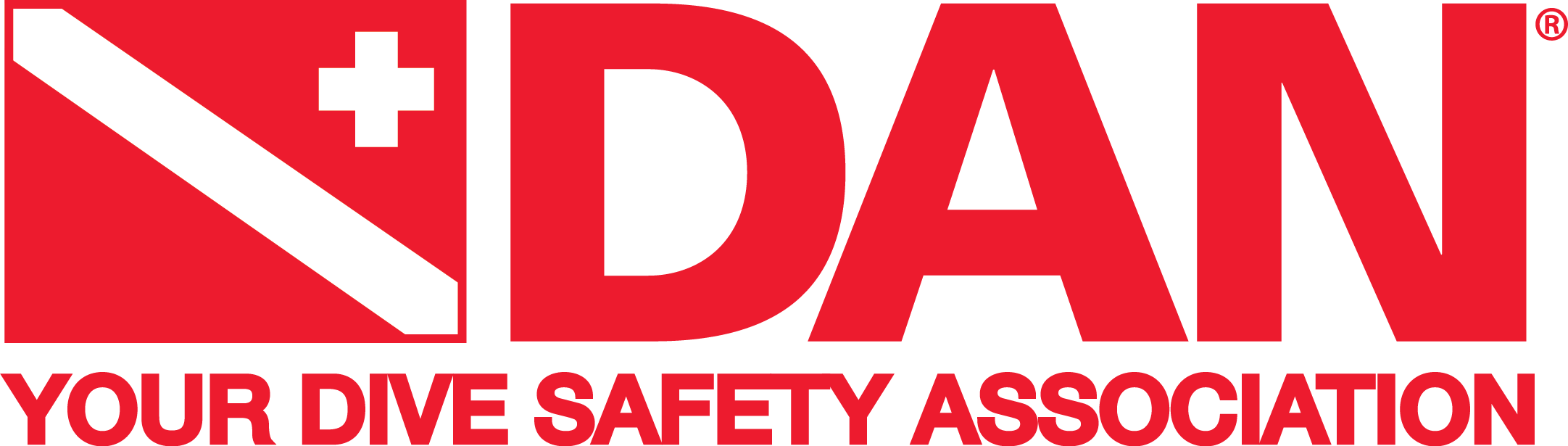
- Abbreviation: DAN America
- Formation: 1980
- Type: NGO
- Legal status: 501(c)(3) association
- Purpose: Scuba diving safety
- Headquarters: Durham, North Carolina
- Location(s): 6 West Colony Place Durham, NC 27705 United States
- Region served: United States & Canada
- Members: > 230,000 (Feb. 2016)
- President/CEO: Bill Ziefle
- Main organ: Board Of Directors
- Subsidiaries: DAN Asia Pacific; DAN Europe; DAN Japan; DAN Southern Africa
- Website: www.dan.org
- Formerly called: National Diving Accident Network

Divers Alert Network America, DAN America, or just DAN is a non-profit 501(c)(3) organization devoted to assisting divers in need. It is supported by donations, grants, and membership dues. Its research department conducts medical research on recreational scuba diving safety while its medical department helps divers to find answers to their diving medical questions. Regions of coverage include the United States and Canada.

== DAN Asia-Pacific ==
Divers Alert Network Asia-Pacific
- Abbreviation: DAN Asia-Pacific
- Purpose: Scuba diving safety
- Headquarters: 49A Karnak Road, Ashburton, 3147
- Location: Victoria, Australia
- Region served: Australia, China, India, Korea, New Zealand, the South Pacific, Southeast Asia and Taiwan
- Members: 10,561 (June 2014)

Divers Alert Network Asia Pacific Limited (DAN Asia Pacific) is a diving safety organization founded in 1994 and has not-for-profit incorporation in Australia as a public company limited by guarantee. The address for legal, operational and administrative purposes is 49A Karnak Road, Ashburton, Victoria, 3147, Australia. It previously traded under the following names - Divers Alert Network (DAN) S.E. Asia-Pacific Limited and DAN Australasia Limited.

It is funded by membership subscriptions, insurance commissions, training courses, product sales and other undisclosed sources.

Membership as of June 2014 totalled 10,561.

Its region of operation includes Australia, China, India, Korea, New Zealand, the South Pacific, Southeast Asia and Taiwan.

=== Services ===
==== Medical hotlines ====
DAN Asia Pacific promotes the use of 24-hour emergency hotline services in Australia, New Zealand and Korea. It fully funds the operation of the Australian hotline, the Diving Emergency Service, which is based in the Hyperbaric Medical Unit at the Royal Adelaide Hospital in South Australia and which provides medical consultancy service for diving-related emergencies on a 24-hour basis within and outside of Australia.

==== Insurance cover ====
As of 2016, DAN Asia Pacific provides insurance cover for its members in Australia underwritten by Honan Insurance Group Pty Ltd and cover for its members residing outside of Australia underwritten by Accident & General Insurance Company, Ltd.

==== Training ====
DAN Asia Pacific provides training and certification for divers, professional rescuers and the general public in respect to diving and general first aid. It also trains and qualifies instructors to provide this training. It has status in Australia as a registered provider of vocational education under the Australian government's Australian Qualifications Framework. As of 2016, it offers the following training courses including some which have national recognition in Australia:

- Oxygen for dive accidents
- Basic oxygen administration
- First aid programs
- Automated external defibrillators
- Cardiopulmonary resuscitation
- Anaphylaxis
- Advanced oxygen provision
- First aid for hazardous marine life injuries
- On-site neurological assessment
- Instructor training

=== Membership ===
DAN Asia Pacific offers the following membership classes:

- individuals
- family

=== Research ===
Examples of DAN Asia Pacific research projects:

- Reports on Australian diving deaths for the years 1972 to 2002

== DAN Brasil ==
Region of coverage is Brazil.

== DAN Europe ==
Divers Alert Network Europe
- Abbreviation: DAN Europe
- Formation: 1983
- Type: NGO
- Legal status: Not for profit European Foundation
- Purpose: Scuba diving safety
- Headquarters: C. da Padune 11,
- Location: 64026 Roseto Italy
- Region served: Europe, Mediterranean, Middle East, Red Sea, Persian Gulf, north-east Africa
- Members: > 100,000
- President and Chief Executive: Prof. Alessandro Marroni. M.D.
- Affiliations: Founding member of International DAN
- Website: www.daneurope.org/web/guest/home
- Formerly called: International Diving Assistance (IDA)

Divers Alert Network Europe (DAN Europe) is an international non-profit medical and research organization founded in 1983. The legal address is 26, Triq Fidiel Zarb, Gharghur NXR07, Malta, but the operational and administrative address is C. da Padune 11, 64026 Roseto Italy

The Foundation is primarily funded through the membership fees paid annually by individual supporters, and also through contributions by public or private individuals or organisations, through the sale of goods and services related to its statutory activities, and fund raising schemes, subsidies or sponsorships in order to finance specific projects such as medical and scientific research. Membership (Feb. 2016) exceeds 100,000.

Region of coverage includes geographical Europe, other countries bordering the Mediterranean Sea, the countries on the shores of the Red Sea, the Middle East including the Persian Gulf, the countries on the shores of the Indian Ocean north of the equator and west of (not including) India and Sri Lanka, and their overseas territories, districts and protectorates.

=== Services ===
DAN Europe provides expert information and advice for the benefit of its members and the diving public, including:

- emergency medical advice and assistance for underwater diving injuries.
- promoting diving safety
- underwater diving research and education
- providing information on issues of common concern to the diving public

==== Medical hotline ====
DAN Europe provides its members with medical assistance in case of a diving emergency, 24/7 and from anywhere in the world. There is an international line for use when the member is abroad, and each country has a national emergency number.

- When the emergency is in the diver's country of residence, the national hotline is used and the case is managed locally from the national center, according to Standard DAN Europe protocol.
- When the emergency occurs outside of the diver's country of residence. the central DAN Europe hotline is used. A diver who calls from abroad is normally put into contact with a DAN specialist of the same language as the victim, so that the case may be evaluated without language difficulties.

- If the accident occurred in an area where a national DAN centre exists, the local centre will manage the emergency in coordination with the Rome centre and the specialist from the victim's home country.
- If the accident occurred in a country without a national DAN centre, the intervention will be managed directly by the central DAN Europe hotline.

==== Medical advice ====
For non-urgent diving medical information DAN Europe has a number of articles on the website, an FAQ page, and if the information needed was not available from those resources, there is an email form to request information. Specialised medical advice is reserved to active DAN Members.

==== Insurance cover ====
DAN Europe provides insurance cover for members underwritten by International Diving Assurance.

==== Technical ====
Since 1997 the Recompression Chamber Assistance and Partnership Program has been available to provide recompression chambers operators with equipment, training and emergency assistance, to help ensure that they are available, in good condition and safe when needed.

==== Training ====
DAN Europe provides training and certification for divers professional rescuers and the general public and in aspects of first aid, and trains instructors to provide this training.

Courses available include:

- Oxygen First Aid for Scuba Diving Injuries
- Advanced Oxygen First Aid for Scuba Diving Injuries
- First Aid for Hazardous Marine Life Injures
- Automated External Defibrillation
- Basic Life Support
- First Aid
- Oxygen first aid for aquatic emergencies
- On-Site Neurological Assessment for Divers
- Medical Oxygen Rebreather
- Dive Medicine for Divers
- Paediatric Basic Life Support
- Diving Medical Technician
- Instructor Qualification Course

=== Membership ===
Membership classes of DAN Europe include:

- ordinary members
- supporting members
- promoting members
- honorary members

=== Research ===
Examples of DAN Europe research projects:

- Gathering data on circulating gas bubbles and analysing the data.
- "The economy of decompression": Optimization of ascent profiles.
- Investigating the causes of unexplained diving incidents.
- Stress in recreational diving.
- Risk of decompression illness relating to patent foramen ovale.
- Managing asthma and diabetes in diving.
- Physiology and pathophysiology of breath-hold in adults and children.
- Hypothermia and diving.
- Headache and diving.
- Blood changes associated with diving.
- Decompression sickness risk when travelling by air after diving.
- Physiological effects of rebreather diving.
- Effects of decompression stress on endothelial stem cells and blood cells.
- Early biomarkers for decompression stress.
- The effects of normobaric oxygen on blood and in first aid for decompression illness.

== DAN Japan ==
Region of coverage includes Japan, Japanese islands and related territories, with regional IDAN responsibility for Northeast Asia-Pacific.

== DAN Southern Africa ==
Divers Alert Network Southern Africa
- Abbreviation: DAN SA
- Formation: 17 January 1997
- Type: NGO
- Legal status: Section 21 not for profit company
- Purpose: Scuba diving safety
- Headquarters: Midrand, Gauteng, South Africa
- Location: Rosen Office Park, DAN Building, Halfway Gardens, Midrand 1685
- Region served: Africa south of the equator and Indian Ocean islands
- Members: >5000 (October 2018)
- CEO: Mr Morne Christou
- Main organ: Board Of Directors
- Staff: Five full time staff, twelve on-call diving doctors
- Website: www.dansa.org

Divers Alert Network Southern Africa is a Public Benefit Organization with the primary purpose to provide emergency medical advice and assistance for underwater diving injuries, to work to prevent injuries and to promote dive safety.

DAN SA also promotes and supports research and education relating to the improvement of dive safety, medical treatment and first aid, and provides information on dive safety, diving physiology and diving medical issues of common concern to the diving public. Legal advice relating to diving matters is also available. The organisation is funded by membership fees, training fees, donations and the sale of branded first aid, safety and promotional products.

Regions of coverage include South Africa, Angola, Botswana, Comoros, Kenya, Lesotho, Madagascar, Malawi, Mauritius, Mozambique, Namibia, Seychelles, Swaziland, Tanzania, Zaire, Zambia, and Zimbabwe.

=== Timeline ===
- 1996: DAN SA was founded and recognized as a valid membership organisation by International Divers Alert Network.
- 1997: DAN SA was registered as a Section 21 not for profit organisation.

=== Services ===
==== Medical hotline ====
DAN South Africa provides emergency hotline for diving and evacuation emergencies. Response staff and diving medicine specialists are on call 24 hours a day, 365 days a year, to provide information and assist with care coordination and evacuation assistance. A toll-free 0800 number is available for calls from within South Africa, and an international number for calls from outside South Africa which is not toll-free.

==== Medical advice ====
DAN SA also provides a diving medical information service. During business hours this can be accessed by telephone or e-mail. Other related information is available from a FAQ and articles on the website. They are linked to the South African Underwater and Hyperbaric Medical Association (SAUHMA) diving medical practitioner database, and maintain an international list of diving medical practitioners for referral.

==== Legal advice ====
DAN has access to legal professionals with an interest in diving and who are experienced in local, regional and international law. Members who are in need of legal assistance can contact DAN via email. DAN staff will consider requests and, if appropriate, refer the member to an appropriate legal expert within the network, who will make appropriate suggestions to the member on how best to represent or defend their interests.

==== Insurance cover ====
DAN SA is not an insurance company. It has a group insurance policy from AIG South Africa which allows it to extend emergency cover to members for specific diving, travel and medical emergencies. Cover is limited according to membership level.

Cover includes:

- Medical expenses for treatment of injuries which occur in the water and are a direct consequence of diving or snorkelling activities.
- Emergency medical expenses while travelling outside country of residence.
- Evacuation costs to nearest appropriate medical treatment facilities for incidents in categories above.

==== Technical ====
A joint project of DAN SA and Subaquatic Safety Services (SSS) Network established the Zanzibar Hyperbaric Chamber, which is the only publicly available hyperbaric facility in East Africa.

==== Training ====
DAN SA provides training and certification for divers in aspects of diving first aid, and trains instructors to provide this training.

Courses available include:

- Oxygen First Aid for Scuba Diving Injuries
- Advanced Oxygen First Aid for Scuba Diving Injuries
- First Aid for Hazardous Marine Life Injures
- Automated External Defibrillators for Scuba Diving
- Basic Life Support
- DAN First Aid
- On-Site Neurological Assessment for Divers
- Diving Medicine for Divers
- Diving Emergency Management Provider (DEMP) Programme: This is a package of:

- Oxygen First Aid for Scuba Diving Injuries
- Advanced Oxygen First Aid for Scuba Diving Injuries
- Automated External Defibrillators for Scuba Diving
- First Aid for Hazardous Marine Life Injuries

- The Diving Emergency Specialist
- Instructor Qualification Course
- Instructor Trainer Workshop

=== Membership ===
Several options for membership of DAN SA are available:

- Annual membership for individual divers and immediate family members
- Temporary membership for short duration trips
- Student membership for entry-level students
- Commercial membership for commercial divers and diving contractors
- Industry partner for dive businesses
- Diving safety partners for dive businesses

=== Research ===
DAN SA cooperates with DAN Europe and the University of Stellenbosch in gathering crowdsourced data for decompression and other diving physiology and medicine, and diving accident research projects. Most of these are long-term projects, but annual statistical reports are published, and contributing divers can get immediate feedback on relative risk of their uploaded dive profiles.

=== Alert diver (SA edition) ===
The Alert Diver is a magazine containing information on dive medicine, the latest DAN statistics, and research, safety and training advice by DAN staff. It is published twice-yearly in paper and digital versions. Non-members can download the digital version of the Alert Diver for a nominal fee.

== DAN World ==
Regions of coverage include the Bahamas, British and U.S. Virgin Islands, Caribbean, Central and South America, Guam, Micronesia and Melanesia (except Fiji), Puerto Rico, and any other places not covered by the regional organisations.

== Research ==
=== Completed programs ===
- Flying After Recompression Treatment Study. Online survey of divers in 2003 who were recompressed for decompression illness within the previous five years and then flew in an airplane. The study was published in the Management of Mild or Marginal Decompression Illness in Remote Locations Workshop Proceedings.
- Diabetes & Diving. Two studies were made on recreational diving by persons with diabetes who showed good general blood glucose control prior to entry to the study. The first followed adults with diabetes who were previously certified to dive and the second studied teenagers with diabetes immediately following their certification training.
- US Navy Survey. DAN conducted a survey of recreational divers to obtain information about diver demographics, dive experience and diving habits on behalf of the US Navy in early 1998.
- Live-aboard Doppler. Researchers assessed the effects of age, gender and dive profiles on post-dive vascular bubble presence in volunteer participants during 1988/9 using Doppler monitoring devices.
- Aging Diver Study. Preliminary evaluation of the effects of age and associated medical conditions on dive style and dive outcome using PDE methodology.
- Breath-Hold Study. The effects of hyperventilation, work, breathing mixture and dive depth on immersed breath-hold duration were investigated to allow an increase in breath-hold time to a maximum safe level without excessive risk of loss of consciousness or functional incapacity due to hypocapnia, hypoxia or hypercapnia.
- Flying After Diving. DAN conducted human trials from 1993 to 1999 to investigate how long to wait after diving before flying for recreational divers with support from the US Navy.
- First Aid Oxygen Rebreather. Performance studies made on first- and second-generation closed-circuit oxygen rebreathing circuits developed for remote duty first aid applications confirmed effective performance in the second-generation device.
- Cialis™/Viagra™ and the Risk of Oxygen Toxicity. A rat model produced positive results of increased risk of oxygen toxicity risk using these drugs.

=== Ongoing programs ===
- Flying After Diving Calibration Study. To find out how exercise affects the minimum safe waiting period before flying after diving.
- Risk/Benefit of PFO Closure. To find out if divers with PFO who underwent the closure procedure are better off than divers with PFO who continue diving without the closure.
- Sudafed and Risk of Oxygen Toxicity. This study uses an animal model to find out whether Sudafed increases the risk of oxygen toxicity.
- Extreme Diving Field Study. To analyse aspects of safety including decompression safety, physical fitness requirements and cardiovascular effects of extreme diving.
- Incidents and Accidents in Compressed Air Diving. DAN compiles case reports of diving incidents, injuries and fatalities in air, nitrox and mixed-gas diving and includes data from these reports in the DAN Annual Diving Report.
- Incidents and Accidents in Breath-Hold Diving. Both fatal and nonfatal cases are collected to identify risks and aid in public education. Data from case reports is included in the DAN Annual Diving Report.
- Project Dive Exploration (PDE). Dive profiles, diver characteristics and diver behaviour are uploaded by volunteers using the dive computer's dive log software and recorded for statistically accurate analysis. This is a prospective observational study of the demographics, medical history, depth-time exposure and medical outcome of a sample of the recreational diving population, with the intention of finding the incidence of decompression sickness in population subgroups and the relationship of DCS probability to depth-time profile and dive and diver characteristics. The data also provides an injury-free control population for comparison with DAN's injury and fatality data to identify possible risk factors associated with injury and death. The results of this study are likely to be useful in the development of future decompression models. Divers using one of many compatible dive computers may contribute their electronic dive log data to PDE.
- DAN Membership Health Survey. To establish the prevalence of cardiovascular risk factors, diabetes and asthma, access to primary health care and the diving practices of DAN Members to help the diving community decide on preventive measures for injuries and fatalities.
- Database of Dive Exposure and Dive Outcomes. Data from the US Navy, Duke University, PDE, DAN Europe's Dive Safety Lab and the Institute of Nautical Archaeology are converted to a format which can be used as a reference database for calibration and evaluation of decompression algorithms.
- Diver Physical Fitness Study. Physical fitness of divers and the physical fitness required for typical diving activities will be assessed.
- Fatality Database. DAN collects data on diving fatalities of recreational divers in the US, Canada and diving destinations frequented by US and Canadian divers, compiles case reports, and includes the data in the DAN Annual Diving Report.

=== Publications ===
DAN publishes research results on a wide range of matters relating to diving safety and medicine and diving accident analysis, including annual reports on decompression illness and diving fatalities. Many are freely available on the internet.

The magazine "Alert Diver" is published by some of the regional branches, including the US, Europe, and Southern Africa, in paper and electronic formats. Although the different publications may occasionally reprint material from each other, they generally contain different content. Article topics generally include diving physiology, medicine, safety, and diving destinations.

== Conferences ==
=== Rebreather Forum 3 ===
In May 2012, DAN along with the American Academy of Underwater Sciences and the Professional Association of Diving Instructors hosted the Rebreather Forum 3 (RF3) which was organised by Rosemary E Lunn. This three-day safety symposium was convened to address major issues surrounding rebreather technology, and its application in commercial, media, military, scientific, recreational and technical diving. Experts, manufactures, instructor trainers, training agencies and divers from all over the world discussed this technology and shared information. Associate Professor Simon J Mitchell chaired the final session at RF3 and, as a result, 16 key consensus statements were agreed and ratified by the global rebreather community.

== In media ==
- "The Mystery of the Bends," a 1992 episode of the PBS television series Return to the Sea, includes a profile of the Divers Alert Network.

== See also ==
- Diving Diseases Research Centre – British hyperbaric medical organization
- Diving Medical Advisory Council – Independent organisation of diving medical specialists from Northern Europe
- European Underwater and Baromedical Society – Source of information for diving and hyperbaric medicine
- Rubicon Foundation – American non-profit foundation
- Southern African Underwater and Hyperbaric Medical Association
- South Pacific Underwater Medicine Society – Publisher for diving and hyperbaric medicine and physiology
- 2026 Thinwana Kandu cave diving incident
