= Rubicon Foundation =

American non-profit foundation

Rubicon Foundation, Inc.
- Founded: 2002
- Type: 501(c)(3)
- Purpose: research, exploration, science and education
- Location: Durham, North Carolina, USA
- Region served: Worldwide
- Revenue: Grants and donations
- Employees: 0
- Volunteers: 11

Rubicon Foundation, Inc. is a non-profit organization devoted to contributing to the interdependent dynamic between research, exploration, science and education. The foundation, started in 2002, is located in Durham, North Carolina and is primarily supported by donations and grants. Funding has included the Office of Naval Research from 2008 to 2010. Gibson, Dunn & Crutcher has provided pro bono services to assist in copyright searches and support.

As of 2021, the Rubicon Research Repository is no longer available online.

== History ==
In 2002, divers Brian Armstrong, Gene Hobbs, and James Wagner formed the first board of directors for the Rubicon Foundation.

== Rubicon Research Repository ==
The Rubicon Research Repository (RRR) was the foundation's premier project that started in 2006. The RRR was an online database of environmental physiology reports, including both hyperbaric and hypobaric medicine, as well as other environmental physiology topics. As of 2021 the Rubicon Research Repository is no longer available online.

The RRR contains workshops and annual meeting proceedings from the American Academy of Underwater Sciences; Divers Alert Network's workshops and Report on decompression illness, diving fatalities, and Project Dive Exploration publications spanning from 1988 to 2007; some of the Diving Science And Technology Corp/ Professional Association of Diving Instructors symposia and technical reports; many of the National Underwater Accident Data Center at the University of Rhode Island diving accident and fatality reports spanning 1970 to 1989; workshops sponsored by the Smithsonian Institution Scientific Diving Program; the South Pacific Underwater Medicine Society Journal spanning 1971 to 2005; as well as many theses about diving and hyperbaric medicine.

The collection also holds journals, abstracts, and workshops from the Undersea and Hyperbaric Medical Society such as: Undersea Biomedical Research which spans 1974 to 1992; Journal of Hyperbaric Medicine spanning 1986 to 1992; Undersea and Hyperbaric Medicine Journal started in 1993 to current was started to combine the previous journal content into one location; Annual Scientific Meeting Abstracts starting 1974 to current; as well as many of the scientific workshop proceedings.

Also available are technical reports from organizations that include: Defence R&D Canada; US Office of Naval Research; Royal Australian Navy School of Underwater Medicine; National Aeronautics and Space Administration; US Navy Experimental Diving Unit; US Naval Medical Research Institute; US Naval Submarine Medical Research Laboratory; as well as US Brooks Air Force Base and The Air Force School of Aerospace Medicine.

Other publications they have made electronic that are not currently included in the RRR are some UHMS's Underwater Medicine and Related Sciences and the Hyperbaric Oxygen Review journal which was published from 1980 to 1985.

== The Rubicon Review ==
The Rubicon Review was a Yahoo! Group with periodic updates of literature in environmental physiology. The project started in 2007 with the goal of helping researchers stay up-to-date with the most current information however it was ended in 2010 due to technical issues with the Yahoo service.

== B-25 Recovery and Preservation Project ==
The B-25c Mitchell bomber was ditched on 4 April 1943 and remained 45 metres (148 ft) below the surface of Lake Murray (South Carolina) for 60 years. The recovery effort was headed by Dr. Robert Seigler and supervised by Gary Larkins of the Air Pirates. Rubicon Foundation divers participated in the recovery effort in 2005. The project was documented by the History Channel and televised on their show Mega Movers. The plane is being preserved by the Southern Museum of Flight in Birmingham, Alabama. This project carried Explorers Club flag number 103.

== Project Pink Tank ==
In 2010, Rubicon started Project Pink Tank with a goal to improve the knowledge available to breast cancer survivors about their engagement in scuba diving. The methods applied for this project will also affect further diving medical research.

== Publications ==
- GUE (2006). The Mysterious Malady: Toward an understanding of decompression injuries (DVD). Global Underwater Explorers. Archived from the original on 2011-06-11.
- Hobbs, GW (2006-11-05). "Hyperbaric Medical Literature". Global Underwater Explorers Annual Conference Gainesville, FL. Archived from the original on January 16, 2007.
- Carden, VR; Koonts, RS; Peterson, RA; Lackey, CS; Thibodeau, PL; Hobbs, GW (2007-05-20). "Creating an Revolution in Hyperbaric Medicine". Presented: Medical Library Association Annual Meeting, Philadelphia, PA. Archived from the original on 2008-12-07. "mla07 Hyperbaric Poster.pdf June 9, 2007 archive"
- Hobbs GW; Armstrong BM; Armstrong HC; Schreiber JS; Kaylor ZM; Vann RD (2007). "What Can The Medical Community Do For Technical Divers?". Undersea and Hyperbaric Medical Society Annual Meeting, Kapaluna, Maui Hawaii. Archived from the original on July 27, 2011.
- Lackey, CS; Hobbs, GW; Carden, VR; Koonts, RS; Peterson, RA; Thibodeau, PL (2007). "Recommended Key Words for Undersea and Hyperbaric Medical Literature". Undersea and Hyperbaric Medical Society Annual Meeting, Kapaluna, Maui Hawaii. Archived from the original on July 27, 2011.
- Carden, VR; Koonts, RS; Peterson, RA; Lackey, CS; Thibodeau, PL; Hobbs, GW (2007). "Serving Up Hyperbaric Medicine Information – Cooking with the Undersea & Hyperbaric Medical Society & Rubicon Foundation". Medical Library Association Mid-Atlantic Chapter Meeting. Baltimore. Archived from the original on 2008-12-07. "mac07 Hyperbaric Poster.pdf"
- Hobbs, GW (2008-09-04). "Diving and Hyperbaric Medical Literature". Duke Center for Hyperbaric Medicine and Environmental Physiology Grand Rounds.
- Li, JH; Hobbs, GW (2009). "The Use of Wikipedia for Increasing Awareness About Undersea and Hyperbaric Medicine. (Abstract)". Undersea and Hyperbaric Medicine. 36 (4). Undersea and Hyperbaric Medical Society: 253. ;

== See also ==
- Undersea and Hyperbaric Medical Society – US based hyperbaric research organization
- South Pacific Underwater Medicine Society – Publisher for diving and hyperbaric medicine and physiology
- Divers Alert Network – Group for improving diving safety
- Diving Diseases Research Centre – British hyperbaric medical organization
