= Peter B. Bennett =

English medical researcher (1931–2022)

- Born: 12 June 1931; Portsmouth, Hampshire, England
- Died: 9 August 2022 (aged 91)
- Education: University of London; University of Southampton
- Occupation: Academic
- Employers: Duke University; Royal Navy (1953–1972)

Peter B. Bennett (12 June 1931 – 9 August 2022) was the founder and a president and CEO of the Divers Alert Network (DAN), a non-profit organization devoted to assisting scuba divers in need. He was a professor of anesthesiology at Duke University Medical Center, and was the Senior Director of the Center for Hyperbaric Medicine and Environmental Physiology at Duke. Bennett is recognized as a leading authority on the effects of high pressure on human physiology.

Bennett was born in Portsmouth, Hampshire, England. He was employed at the Royal Naval Physiology Laboratory near Portsmouth for 20 years, beginning in 1953. During this time, he formed and headed the Defence and Civil Institute for Environmental Medicine in Canada.

== Education ==
- University of London, 1951, B.Sc.
- University of Southampton, 1964, Ph.D.
- University of Southampton, 1984, D.Sc.

== Research ==
As a researcher, Bennett performed studies of nitrogen narcosis, oxygen toxicity, submarine escape, decompression illness, ascent rates, and the effects of flying after diving. Bennett described helium tremors in 1965 and coined the name of high pressure nervous syndrome (HPNS), a diving disorder resulting from breathing a high-pressure mixture of helium and oxygen known as heliox at depths greater than about 150 metres (490 ft). Bennett was a consultant on the James Cameron underwater science fiction film The Abyss, in which a character experiences HPNS.

Bennett is credited with the invention of trimix breathing gas. In 1981, at Duke University Medical Center, he conducted an experiment called Atlantis III lasting 43 days, which involved compressing divers to an equivalent depth of 2,250 feet (690 m), and slowly decompressing them to surface pressure, setting a world record in the process. In 45 years, Bennett published over 200 scientific papers and six books, including The Physiology and Medicine of Diving with David Hallen Elliott in 1982.

== Retirement ==
Dr. Bennett received the 2002 Diving Equipment and Marketing Association (DEMA) Reaching Out Award for his contribution to the diving industry, and the Ernst and Young Entrepreneur of the Year 2002 award for contributions to business in the life sciences. He stepped down as President of the Divers Alert Network of America on 30 June 2003, after 23 years at the helm. Bennett was pressured by board members to step down, in reaction to alleged improprieties in his handling of the organization's finances.

From 2004 to 2007, Bennett served as Executive Director of the International Divers Alert Network.

From 2007 to 2014, Bennett served as the executive director of the Undersea and Hyperbaric Medical Society.

== See also ==
- Divers Alert Network
- Undersea and Hyperbaric Medical Society
