= National Board of Diving and Hyperbaric Medical Technology =

Non-profit organization for education and certification in diving and hyperbaric medicine

- Founded: 1981
- Location: Columbia, South Carolina, United States
- Region served: Worldwide
- Website: http://www.nbdhmt.org/

National Board of Diving and Hyperbaric Medical Technology (NBDHMT), formally known as the National Association of Diving Technicians, is a non-profit organization devoted to the education and certification of qualified personnel in the fields of diving and hyperbaric medicine.

== History ==
The professional divers of the United Brotherhood of Carpenters and Joiners of America sponsored an Undersea and Hyperbaric Medical Society workshop in 1975 to look at the needs for Emergency Medical Technicians (EMT) for the treatment of diving related injuries. This workshop established a need for medically trained personnel in offshore diving operations as well as suggested training standards for EMT divers. Following this workshop, attempts were made to incorporate a "Diver Medic Training Program" into existing paramedic curricula. This proved to be impossible due to the "esoteric nature of undersea medicine, and its geographically and medically remote applications.

In response to this need, the National Association of Diving Technicians was formed in 1981 and introduced a certification program for all technologists working in the field, as well as establishing an introductory training course curriculum standard for those desiring to enter the field.

In 1991, the National Association of Diving Technicians set out to establish a new certification program for hyperbaric technologists and changed their name to the National Board of Diving and Hyperbaric Medical Technology.

Certification through the NBDHMT is required by some of Medicare's regional intermediaries to be reimbursable for transcutaneous oxygen measurement.

In June 2009, the NBDHMT moved their home office from Harvey, Louisiana to Columbia, South Carolina.

== Programs ==
=== Diver Medic Technician ===
The Diver Medic Technician (DMT) program is designed to meet the specific medical care needs of commercial, professional and scientific divers that often work in geographic isolation. DMT's are specifically trained for the various diving hazards and precautions found on remote work sites. The comprehensive curriculum covers a wide range of topics from barotrauma to treatment of decompression sickness.

DMT's have been taking a larger role in traditional hyperbaric oxygenation facilities in the United States. In a survey of 176 monoplace hyperbaric chamber facilities, the mean number of full-time DMTs was 1.43 while the number of part-time DMTs was 1.83 persons.

=== Certified Hyperbaric Technologist ===
The Certified Hyperbaric Technologist (CHT) program is tailored to meet the specific safety and operation needs for biomedical devices within the department and generalized clinical knowledge to administer the clinical treatments.

The curriculum covers a wide range of topics from hyperbaric chamber operations to transcutaneous oxygen monitoring.

=== Certified Hyperbaric Registered Nurse ===
The Certified Hyperbaric Registered Nurse (CHRN) program is a subspecialty for registered nurses. Hyperbaric nursing challenges nurses "to provide safe, cost-effective, quality patient care, according to established standards."

Hyperbaric nurses are sometimes referred to as baromedical nurses and many CHRNs are also members of the Baromedical Nurses Association.

== Certification ==
Certification is granted after a candidate meets the prerequisites and passes the written exams offered each year at the Undersea and Hyperbaric Medical Society annual scientific meeting as well as their regional meetings.

Maintaining certification requires completion of Continuing Education Credits from NBDHMT approved sources like the UHMS or Divers Alert Network.

== See also ==
- Naval Submarine Medical Research Laboratory – U.S. Navy research unit for submarine and diving medicine
