= Diving and Hyperbaric Medicine =

- Discipline: Hyperbaric medicine
- Language: English
- Edited by: Simon Mitchell

Publication details
- History: 2006–current
- Publisher: South Pacific Underwater Medicine Society, European Underwater and Baromedical Society
- Frequency: Quarterly
- Impact factor: 0.8 (2023)

Standard abbreviations
- ISO 4: Diving Hyperb. Med.

Indexing
- ISSN: 1833-3516 (print); 2209-1491 (web)
- OCLC no.: 680434497

Links
- Journal homepage; Online access; Online archive

Diving and Hyperbaric Medicine is a quarterly peer-reviewed medical journal covering hyperbaric medicine. It is published by the European Underwater and Baromedical Society and the South Pacific Underwater Medicine Society. The journal contains original and review articles, case series and reports, educational, and general interest material.

The journal is indexed by the Science Citation Index Expanded, Embase, and MEDLINE. The journal accepts advertisements from industry to assist with the cost of running a journal but also made clear that advertisements did not represent endorsement of those products or services by the organizations.

According to the Journal Citation Reports, the journal has a 2025 impact factor of 1.3.
