= Simon Mitchell =

New Zealand physician and author on diving medicine

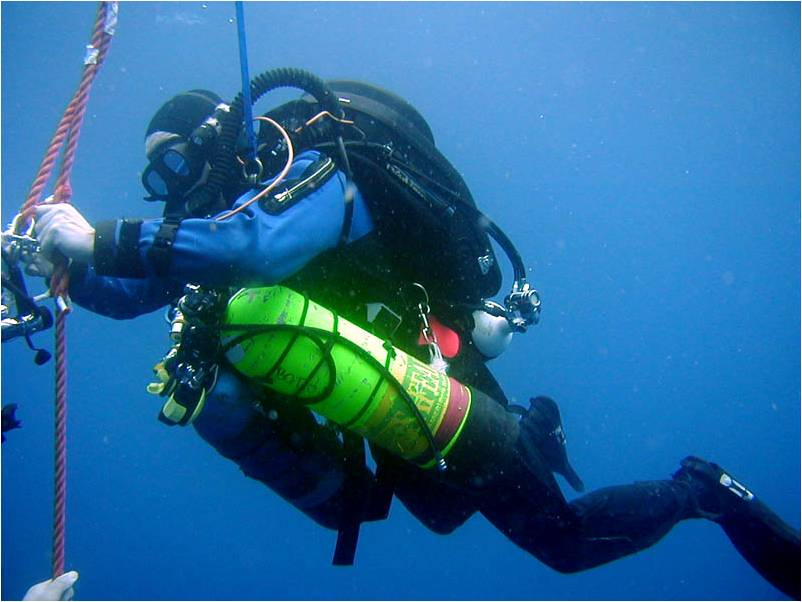
- Mitchell returning from the 2002 world record dive to the wreck of the SS Kyogle. The dive re-opened the file on the AHS Centaur
- Born: 1958 (age 67–68)
- Citizenship: New Zealand; Australia
- Known for: Technical diving; diving medicine
- Spouse: Siân

Simon J. Mitchell (born 1958) is a New Zealand anaesthetist specialising in occupational medicine, hyperbaric medicine and anaesthesiology. He was awarded a PhD in Medicine for his work on neuroprotection from embolic brain injury, and has published more than 45 research and review papers in medical literature.

Mitchell is an author and avid technical diver. He authored two chapters of the latest edition of Bennett and Elliott's Physiology and Medicine of Diving, is the co-author of the diving textbook Deeper Into Diving with John Lippmann, and co-authored the chapter on Diving and Hyperbaric Medicine in Harrison's Principles of Internal Medicine with Michael Bennett.

== Background ==
Mitchell received a Bachelor of Human Biology (BHB) in 1988 and later a Bachelor of Medicine and Bachelor of Surgery (MB ChB) in 1990 from the University of Auckland. In 2001, he received a Diploma in Occupational Medicine (DipOccMed) from the South Pacific Underwater Medicine Society. Mitchell then went on to complete a Doctor of Philosophy in Medicine (PhD) in 2001 and Diploma in Diving and Hyperbaric Medicine (DipDHM) in 1995 from the University of Auckland. Mitchell received his Australian and New Zealand College of Anaesthetists (ANZCA) Certificate in Diving and Hyperbaric Medicine in 2003, and became a Fellow of the Australian and New Zealand College of Anaesthetists (FANZCA) in 2008. He is currently Professor of Anaesthesiology and Head of the Department of Anaesthesiology at the University of Auckland.

Mitchell is a former vice president of the Undersea and Hyperbaric Medical Society (UHMS) and currently serves as the chairman of the organisation's diving committee. He became a Fellow of The Explorers Club of New York in 2006.

Mitchell has dual Australian and New Zealand citizenship. He lives in Auckland, New Zealand.

In 2010, Mitchell was awarded the Albert R. Behnke Award by the UHMS for his outstanding scientific contributions to advances in undersea biomedical activity.

On 23 August 2017, Mitchell delivered his inaugural lecture (as a full professor) at the Grafton Campus, Auckland, New Zealand.

== Diving ==
Mitchell began diving in 1972. His diving often involves the use of rebreather technology to explore shipwrecks at extreme depths.

Mitchell was a member of "The Sydney Project" in 2004 and located the letters U, M, and E that helped with the positive identification of the SS Cumberland. In 2007, Mitchell and Pete Mesley were responsible for identification of the Port Kembla including recovery of the ship's bell. Mitchell attempted to recover a Robinson 22 helicopter engine from the poor underwater visibility of Lake Wānaka for use in the Transport Accident Investigation Commission investigation of the death of Morgan Saxton.

=== AHS Centaur ===
AHS Centaur was a hospital ship which was attacked and sunk by a Japanese submarine off the coast of Queensland, Australia, on 14 May 1943. Of the 332 medical personnel and civilian crew aboard, 268 were killed. Following World War II, several searches of the waters around North Stradbroke and Moreton Islands failed to reveal Centaur’s location. It was believed that she had sunk off the edge of the continental shelf, to a depth the Royal Australian Navy did not, and still does not, have the capability to search for a vessel of Centaur’s size.

In 1995, it was announced that the shipwreck of Centaur had been located in waters 9 nautical miles (17 km) from the lighthouse on Moreton Island, a significant distance from her believed last position. The finding was reported on A Current Affair, during which footage of the shipwreck, 170 metres (560 ft) underwater, was shown. Discoverer Donald Dennis claimed the identity of the shipwreck had been confirmed by the Navy, the Queensland Maritime Museum, and the Australian War Memorial. A cursory search by the Navy confirmed that there was a shipwreck at the given location, which was gazetted as a war grave and added to navigation charts by the Australian Hydrographic Office.

Over the next eight years, there was growing doubt about the position of Dennis' wreck, due to the distance from both Second Officer Rippon's calculation of the point of sinking and where USS Mugford found the survivors. During this time, Dennis had been convicted on two counts of deception and one of theft through scams. Two wreck divers, Trevor Jackson and Simon Mitchell, used the location for a four-hour world record dive on 14 May 2002, during which they examined the wreck and took measurements, claiming that the ship was too small to be Centaur. Jackson had been studying Centaur for some time, and believed that the wreck was actually another, much smaller ship, the 55-metre (180 ft) long MV Kyogle, a lime freighter purchased by the Royal Australian Air Force and sunk during bombing practice on 12 May 1951. The facts gathered on the dive were inconclusive, but the divers remained adamant it was not Centaur, and passed this information onto Nick Greenaway, producer of the newsmagazine show 60 Minutes.

On the 60th anniversary of the sinking, 60 Minutes ran a story demonstrating that the wreck was not Centaur. It was revealed that nobody at the Queensland Maritime Museum had yet seen Dennis' footage, and when it was shown to Museum president Rod McLeod and maritime historian John Foley, they stated that the shipwreck could not be Centaur, as the rudder was incorrectly shaped. Following this story, and others published around the same time in newspapers, the Navy sent three ships to inspect the site over a two-month period; HMA Ships Hawkesbury, Melville, and Yarra, before concluding that the shipwreck was incorrectly identified as Centaur. An amendment was made to the gazettal, and the Hydrographic Office began to remove the mark from charts.

In April 2008, following the discovery of HMAS Sydney, several parties began calling for a dedicated search for Centaur. By the end of 2008, the Australian Federal and Queensland State governments had formed a joint committee and contributed $2 million each towards a search, and by February 2009, the tender for the project had received eleven expressions of interest.

== Awards ==
- DAN / Rolex Diver Of The Year Award 2015
- EUROTEK.2014 Discover Award
- UHMS Albert R. Behnke Award

In 2015, Mitchell was awarded a Bravo award by the New Zealand Skeptics for his rebuttal of claims in a The New Zealand Herald article about a Hyperbaric machine entitled ”Hope is in the air: Hyperbaric chambers – the real deal or a placebo?.

== Bibliography ==
- Jackson, Trevor (2007). Wreck Diving in Southern Queensland. Brisbane, QLD: Lulu.
- Lippmann, John; Mitchell, Simon (2005). Deeper into Diving (2nd ed.). Victoria, Australia: J.L. Publications. ISBN 0-9752290-1-X. OCLC 66524750.
- Select publications by Simon Mitchell

== Works ==
- Mitchell, Simon J (2015) Radio Interview - 'The Five Minute Prebreathe: Sensitive Test For CO2 Scrubber Problems Or A Waste Of Time' At: Beneath The Sea, New York
- Mitchell, Simon J (2011) Video Presentation - 'Overview of decompression models' At: International Congress on Hyperbaric Medicine, South Africa
- Mitchell, Simon J (2011) Video Presentation - 'The problems and pitfalls of off-label use' At: International Congress on Hyperbaric Medicine, South Africa
- Mitchell, Simon J (2012) Video Presentation - 'Anatomy of a CCR Dive' At: Rebreather Forum 3, Friday 18 May 2012
- Mitchell, Simon J (2012) Video Presentation - 'Recommendations and Finding of Rebreather Forum 3' At: Rebreather Forum 3, Sunday 20 May 2012
- S.J. Mitchell; M.H. Bennett; N. Bird; D.J. Doolette; G.W. Hobbs; E. Kay; R.E. Moon; T.S. Neuman; R.D. Vann; R. Walker; H.A. Wyatt. (2012). "Recommendations for rescue of a submerged unresponsive compressed-gas diver". Undersea and Hyperbaric Medicine. 39: 1099–1108.

Refereed journal articles

- Sames C, Gorman D, Mitchell SJ, Gamble G. The utility of repetitive medical examinations of occupational divers. Internal Med J, In press, 2009
- Gorman DF, Sames C, Mitchell SJ. Routine occupational dive medical examinations (Invited Commentary). Diving Hyperbaric Med 39, 109–110, 2009
- Mitchell SJ, Merry AF. Lignocaine: neuroprotective or wishful thinking? J Extracorporeal Technol 41, 37–42, 2009
- Mitchell SJ, Merry AF, Frampton C, Davies E, Grieve D, Mills BP, Webster CS, Milsom FP, Willcox TW, Gorman DF. Cerebral protection by lidocaine during cardiac operations: a follow-up study. Ann Thorac Surg 87, 820–825, 2009
- Mitchell SJ, Doolette DJ. Selective vulnerability of the inner ear to decompression sickness in divers with right to left shunt: the role of tissue gas supersaturation. J Appl Physiol 106, 298–301, 2009
- Safe Surgery Save Lives study group. A surgical safety checklist to reduce morbidity and mortality in a global population. N Engl J Med 360, 491–499, 2009
- Mitchell SJ. Treatment of decompression sickness in the 21st century: a review. Diving Hyperbaric Med 37, 73–75, 2007
- Bennett MH, Lehm JP, Mitchell SJ, Wasiak J. Recompression and adjunctive therapy for decompression illness (Review). In: The Cochrane Library, Issue 2. Chichester, UK: John Wiley & Sons, 2007
- Mitchell SJ, Cronje F, Meintjies WAJ, Britz HC. Fatal respiratory failure during a technical rebreather dive at extreme pressure. Aviat Space Environ Med 78, 81–86, 2007
- Willcox TW, Mitchell SJ. Arterial bubbles from the venous line (Invited Commentary). J Extracorporeal Technol 38, 214–215, 2006
- Smart DR, Bennett MH, Mitchell SJ. Transcutaneous oximetry, problem wounds and hyperbaric oxygen therapy. Diving Hyperbaric Med 36, 72–86, 2006
- Mitchell SJ. From trash to leucocytes: what are we filtering and why? J Extracorporeal Technol 38, 58–63, 2006
- Trytko B, Mitchell SJ. Extreme survival: a deep technical diving accident. SPUMS J 35, 23–27, 2005
- Mitchell SJ. Severity scoring in decompression illness. SPUMS J 35, 199–205, 2005
- Bennett MH, Lehm JP, Mitchell SJ, Wasiak J. Recompression and adjunctive therapy for decompression illness. (Protocol for a Cochrane Review) In: The Cochrane Library, Issue 2, Chichester, UK: John Wiley & Sons, Ltd. 2005
- Mitchell SJ. Children in diving: how young is too young? SPUMS J 33, 81–83, 2003
- Bennett MH, Mitchell SJ, Domingues A. Adjunctive treatment of decompression illness with a non-steroidal anti-inflammatory drug reduces compression requirement. Undersea Hyperbaric Med 30, 195–205, 2003
- Doolette DJ, Mitchell SJ. A biophysical basis for inner ear decompression sickness. J Applied Physiol 94, 2145–2150, 2003
- Mitchell SJ, Gorman DF. The pathophysiology of cerebral arterial gas embolism. J Extracorporeal Technol 34, 18–23, 2002
- Mitchell SJ. Immersion pulmonary oedema. SPUMS J 32, 200–204, 2002 Mitchell SJ. Salt water aspiration syndrome. SPUMS J 32, 205–206, 2002
- Taylor LT, Mitchell SJ. Diabetes and diving: should old dogma give way to new evidence? SPUMS J 31, 44–50, 2001
- Doolette DJ, Mitchell SJ. The physiological kinetics of nitrogen and the prevention of decompression sickness. Clin Pharmacokinetics 40, 1-14, 2001
- Mitchell SJ. Lidocaine in the treatment of decompression illness: a review of the literature. Undersea Hyperbaric Med 28, 165–174, 2001
- Mitchell SJ, Benson M. Vadlamudi L, Miller P. Arterial gas embolism by helium: an unusual case successfully treated with hyperbaric oxygen and lidocaine. Ann Emerg Med 35, 300–303, 2000
- Mitchell SJ, Willcox T, Milsom FP, Gorman DF. Physical and pharmacological neuroprotection in cardiac surgery. Sem Cardiothorac Vasc Anesth 4, 80–85, 2000
- Mitchell SJ, Pellett O, Gorman DF. Cerebral protection by lidocaine during cardiac operations. Ann Thorac Surg 67, 1117–1124, 1999
- Gorman DF, Mitchell SJ. A history of cerebral arterial gas embolism research: key publications. SPUMS J 29, 34–39, 1999
- Willcox TW, Mitchell SJ, Gorman DF. Venous air in the bypass circuit: a source of arterial line emboli exacerbated by vacuum assisted drainage. Ann Thorac Surg 68, 1285–1291, 1999
- Grindlay J, Mitchell SJ. Isolated pulmonary oedema associated with scuba diving. Emergency Med 11, 272–276, 1999
- Richardson K, Mitchell SJ, Davis MF, Richards M. Decompression illness in New Zealand Divers: the 1996 experience. SPUMS J 28, 50–55, 1998
- Mitchell SJ, Holley A, Gorman DF. A new system for scoring severity and recovery in decompression illness. SPUMS J 28, 84–94, 1998
- Milsom FP, Mitchell SJ. A novel dual vent heart de-airing technique markedly reduces carotid artery microemboli. Ann Thorac Surg; 66, 785–791, 1998
- Mitchell SJ, Willcox T, Gorman DF. Bubble generation and venous air filtration by hard- shell venous reservoirs: a comparative study. Perfusion 12, 325–333, 1997
- Mitchell SJ, Pellett O, Gorman DF. Open chamber cardiac surgery: a clinical injury model for arterial gas embolism. SPUMS J 27, 230–235, 1997
- Mitchell SJ, Willcox T, McDougall C, Gorman DF. Emboli generation by the Medtronic Maxima hardshell adult venous reservoir in cardio-pulmonary bypass circuits: a preliminary report. Perfusion 11, 145–155, 1996
- Gardner M, Forbes C, Mitchell SJ. One hundred cases of decompression illness treated in New Zealand during 1995. SPUMS J 26, 222–226, 1996
- Mitchell SJ. The role of lignocaine in the treatment of decompression illness - A review of the literature. SPUMS J 25, 182–194, 1995
- Mitchell SJ. Assessment of fitness for diving. Practice Nurse 2, 25 – 26, 1995 Mitchell SJ, Gorman DF2. Near Drowning. General Practitioner 2, 8–9, 1994
- Gorman DF, Drewry A, Mitchell SJ. A progress report on diving medicine studies in the RNZN. SPUMS J 24, 161–163, 1994
- Mitchell SJ. Diving Accidents. Patient Management January, 25 – 30, 1993
- Mitchell SJ. Near Drowning. Patient Management January, 11 – 13, 1993
- Mitchell SJ, Gorman DF. Diving Accidents. General Practitioner 1, 8 – 9, 1993
- Mitchell SJ. The diet of ling (Genypterus blacodes) from four New Zealand off-shore fishing grounds. NZ J Marine Freshw Res 18, 1984
- Harris RJ, Challen CJ, Mitchell SJ. The first deep rebreather dive using hydrogen: case report. Diving and Hyperbaric Medicine. 1, 69-72, 2024
