= Diving Medical Advisory Council =

Independent organisation of diving medical specialists from Northern Europe

- Abbreviation: DMAC
- Formation: November 11, 1975; 50 years ago
- Legal status: active
- Purpose: Improving the medical support of professional diving
- Chairman: Dr Olav Sande Eftedal
- Website: dmac-diving.org

The Diving Medical Advisory Council (DMAC) is an independent organisation of diving medical specialists, mostly from across Northern Europe which exists to provide expert advice about medical and some safety aspects of commercial diving. The advice is published in the form of guidance documents, which are made available for download.

The committee has also issued position statements on the following subjects:

- Commercial Diving and Health (October 2006)
- Health Surveillance of Commercial Divers (April 2008)
- Exercise Testing in Medical Assessment of Commercial Divers (October 2009)
- Requirement for Air Diving to 50 msw in Commercial Diver Training (March 2013)
- Deep Saturation Diving (April 2013)
- Education and Training in Diving Medicine (November 2014)

== Publications ==
The DMAC diving medical guidance publications are freely downloadable from the website, and include:

- DMAC 01: Aide-mémoire for recording and transmission of medical data to shore
- DMAC 02: In-water diver monitoring
- DMAC 03: Accidents with high-pressure water jets
- DMAC 04: Oxygen content in open circuit bail-out bottles for heliox saturation diving
- DMAC 05: Recommendation on minimum level of O2 in helium supplied offshore
- DMAC 06: The effects of sonar transmission on commercial diving activities
- DMAC 07: Flying after diving: Recommendations
- DMAC 08: Thermal stress in relation to diving (Report of a workshop held in March 1981)
- DMAC 11: Provision of first aid and the training of divers, supervisors and members of dive teams in first aid
- DMAC 12: Safe diving distance from seismic surveying operations
- DMAC 13: Fitness to return to diving after decompression illness
- DMAC 15: Medical equipment to be held at the site of an offshore diving operation
- DMAC 18: Human Immunodeficiency Virus (HIV) Infection and Acquired Immune Deficiency Syndrome (AIDS) in Commercial Diving
- DMAC 19: The effects of water vapour on diver physiology
- DMAC 20: Duration of bell lockouts
- DMAC 21: Guidance on the duration of saturation exposures and surface intervals between saturations
- DMAC 22: Proximity to a recompression chamber after surfacing
- DMAC 23: The use of heliox in treating decompression sickness
- DMAC 24: Differential diagnosis
- DMAC 26: Saturation diving chamber hygiene
- DMAC 28: The provision of emergency medical care for divers in saturation
- DMAC 29: Approval of diving medicine courses
- DMAC 30: Management in divers of osteonecrosis at Ficat stage 1
- DMAC 31: Accelerated emergency decompression (AED) from saturation
- DMAC 32: Guidance on dealing with the body of a deceased diver in saturation
- Workshop: Accelerated emergency decompression from saturation in commercial diving operations (Report of a workshop held in April 2011)
- Workshop: Improving diver safety current medical issues (Report of a workshop held in October 2014)

(missing numbers have been withdrawn or superseded)

== Courses ==
DMAC approves training courses in diving medicine which comply with the requirements of the joint committee of the European Committee for Hyperbaric Medicine (ECHM) and the European Diving Technology Committee (EDTC) "Training Standards for Diving and Hyperbaric Medicine", which specifies: Level 1 - Medical assessment of divers (Medical Examiner of Divers), and Level 2D - Medical management of diving accidents and illnesses (Diving Medical Physician).

== Use of DMAC guidance documents ==
Canadian association of diving contractors members are required in terms of CSA Z275.2-15 Occupational Safety Code for Diving Operations Items 8 and 9, to comply with DMAC guidance documents for surface-supplied offshore gas and oil diving and deep diving, including mixed gas and saturation diving.
