= Constitution (corporate) =

A constitution (or governing document) is the set of regulations which govern the conduct of non-political entities, whether incorporated or not. Such entities include corporations and voluntary associations.

== See also ==
- Corporate governance
- Articles of association
- Memorandum of association
