= Mega Movers =

US television series

Mega Movers is a television program on History Channel. It first aired on April 18, 2006.

The program details the preparations and inside problems and details of large moves, such as historical buildings being relocated to new sites miles away (city halls, famous mansions, apartment houses etc.), oil derricks and such like difficult moves (church and steeple, large off-road dump trucks, oil platforms, off-track locomotives, etc.).

== See also ==
- Monster Moves
