= European Diving Technology Committee =

International organisation for improving professional diver safety

European Diving Technology Committee eV.
- Abbreviation: EDTC
- Formation: March 1973; 53 years ago
- Purpose: Professional diver safety
- Location: Kiel, Federal Republic of Germany
- Members: Membership is open to representatives of any country within geographical Europe
- Chairman: Jørn Ryberg
- Website: www.edtc.org

The European Diving Technology Committee eV. (EDTC) is an association registered in Kiel, Federal Republic of Germany for the purpose of making professional diving safer by creating international standards. Membership is open to all countries of the continent of Europe, with each country having one representative from the medical, industrial, government and trade union sectors. Some major diving industry associations are also involved. As of May 2016, 22 nations and 6 international non-governmental organisations were represented in the EDTC.

== Membership ==
Membership is open to any country within the continent of Europe, and specialist organisations.

Countries represented include: Austria, Belgium, Croatia, Czech Republic, Denmark, Estonia, Finland, France, Germany, Italy, Latvia, Norway, Poland, Portugal, Romania, Spain, Slovak Republic, Sweden, Switzerland, The Netherlands, Turkey and the United Kingdom.

Institutions represented include: International Marine Contractors Association (IMCA), International Association of Oil and Gas Producers (OGP), International Transport Workers' Federation (ITF), International Diving Schools Association (IDSA), European Underwater Federation (EUF) and International Diving Regulators and Certifiers Forum (IDRCF).

== Publications ==
EDTC has published guidance documents to be used as a basis for national requirements. These include:

- Guidance for Diving on Renewable Energy Projects - Document No: EDTC-GD-001
- Goal-setting Principles for Harmonised Diving Standards in Europe - Document No: EDTC-GS-001-1/15
- Training Objectives for a Diving Medicine Physician
- Training standards for diving and hyperbaric medicine
- Offshore Diving Regulations: Different countries - European diving regulations.doc
- European Diving Technology Committee Diving Industry Personnel Competence Standards
- Medical Assessment of Working Divers. Fitness to Dive Standards of European Diving Technology Committee. Edited by Jűrg Wendling, David Elliott and Tor Nome. Published by European Diving Technology Committee, 2004. ISBN 3-952284-2-7.
