= Diving Diseases Research Centre =

British hyperbaric medical organization

Coordinates: 50.4168°N 4.1102°W

- Founded: 1980; 46 years ago
- Purpose: Hyperbaric medicine, training, and research
- Website: www.ddrc.org

The "Diving Diseases Research Centre" (alternatively known as DDRC Healthcare) is a hyperbaric medical centre in Plymouth Science Park, in southern England.

== History ==
The centre was founded as a charitable institution in 1980. Early operations involved three hyperbaric chambers, which were donated by the diving research specialist Comex, that were based in a coastal boatshed at Fort Bovisand, outside Plymouth. While early work had largely focused on decompression sickness, the centre had rebranded as DDRC Healthcare by 1993, in line with increasing applications of hyperbaric medicine for other ailments, including supporting wound healing and counteracting carbon monoxide poisoning using hyperbaric oxygen chamber.

In 1996, following several years of fundraising, the centre relocated to a greenfield site adjacent to Derriford Hospital, now known as the Plymouth Science Park. It was provisioned with a new larger chamber, as well as two older chambers transported from the Fort Bovisand location, the new complex incorporated its own specialised research laboratory and training facilities for hyperbaric medicine. So provisioned, the centre could undertake various forms of research trials; to this end, it has published various reports and research papers. Amongst other organisations, the centre has provided training to volunteers of the Royal National Lifeboat Institution (RNLI). It has also worked alongside the RNLI to promote fitness checks for divers.

In January 2006, the centre's head, Dr Philip Bryson, gave evidence to an inquest into diver deaths, criticising the practice of compacted courses for exposing unexperienced divers too quickly to elevated risks that potentially lead to fatalities.

By the 2010s, the centre was operating six chambers at two locations, Newport and Plymouth, that could treat up to 10 patients per day for various conditions. While it continues to treat patients with decompression sickness, this group only comprised roughly one-third of all patients treated by 2024. In 2021, work to expand the centre's Plymouth facility was completed, which has increased the range of research projects and added new equipment, including an MRI machine; funding for this expansion came from both the National Health Service and the University of Plymouth.
