= South Pacific Underwater Medicine Society =

Publisher for diving and hyperbaric medicine and physiology

The South Pacific Underwater Medicine Society (SPUMS) is a primary source of information for diving and hyperbaric medicine physiology worldwide.

== History ==
The SPUMS was founded on May 3, 1971 in the wardroom of HMAS Penguin. The founding members of SPUMS were Carl Edmonds, Bob Thomas, Douglas Walker, Ian Unsworth, and Cedric Deal and they were joined by approximately 20 others as "charter members". The society was incorporated in 1990.

== Purpose ==
The aims of SPUMS have never changed since its inception:

- To promote and facilitate the study of all aspects of underwater and hyperbaric medicine;
- To provide information on underwater and hyperbaric medicine;
- To publish a journal and;
- To convene members of each Society annually at a scientific conference.

== Training ==
SPUMS offers a Diploma of Diving and Hyperbaric Medicine. This certification, was the first non-naval certification and for years the only postgraduate education available. The first Diplomas by examination were awarded to Chris Acott, Gavin Dawson, and John Knight in 1975.

== Publications ==
In 1971, a newsletter was published by Dr. Carl Edmonds and distributed to diving medical professionals. This newsletter grew to become the Journal of the South Pacific Underwater Medicine Society in 1975. The journal's name was changed to Diving and Hyperbaric Medicine in 2007 and incorporated the Journal of the European Underwater and Baromedical Society in 2008.

SPUMS also publishes many policies to assist clinicians and diving professionals.

Many of the SPUMS publications were available online at the Rubicon Research Repository.
