= Undersea and Hyperbaric Medical Society =

US based hyperbaric research organization

The Undersea and Hyperbaric Medical Society (UHMS) is an organization based in the US which supports research on matters of hyperbaric medicine and physiology, and provides a certificate of added qualification for physicians with an unrestricted license to practice medicine and for limited licensed practitioners, at the completion of the Program for Advanced Training in Hyperbaric Medicine. They support an extensive library and are a primary source of information for diving and hyperbaric medicine physiology worldwide.

== History ==
The Undersea Medical Society (UMS) grew from the close associations of a small group of scientists. These men realized after a series of International Symposia on Underwater Physiology, initiated by the University of Pennsylvania and the Office of Naval Research that there was a need to stimulate in the field of undersea medicine. This group consisted of diving and aerospace Dr's Edward L. Beckman, Jack L. Kinsey, Christian J. Lambertsen, Walter F. Mazzone, Earl H. Ninow, and Robert D. Workman. The key decision from this meeting was that Dr. Lambertsen was charged with writing the Constitution and establishing the society. They also decided that the Aerospace Medical Association could be the initial home of the UMS.

On 10 April 1967, a meeting was held in Washington, D.C. to introduce the charter membership and elect the society officers and executive committee. There were 88 charter members and the founding Executive committee was made up of Dr's Edward L. Beckman, Albert R. Behnke, George F. Bond, Wallace O. Fenn, Jack L. Kinsey, Christian J. Lambertsen, Walter F. Mazzone, Earl H. Ninow, Heinz R. Schreiner, and Robert D. Workman.

By 1973, the UMS had grown to the point of needing an office and hired Charles W. Shilling as the first Executive secretary. By the next year, the UMS established its scientific journal, Undersea Biomedical Research. The journal continued under this name until 1993 when it was changed to Undersea and Hyperbaric Medicine Journal.

In 1986, the UMS changed its name to the current one. The name change reflected the rapidly growing interest in hyperbaric oxygen physiology and therapy. The UHMS's purpose is to provide scientific information to protect the health of sport, military and commercial divers and to improve the scientific basis of hyperbaric oxygen therapy, promote sound treatment protocols and standards of practice and provide CME accreditation within its field.

== Indications for hyperbaric oxygen ==
UHMS definition of hyperbaric oxygen therapy (HBO): The patient breathes 100% oxygen intermittently while the pressure of the treatment chamber is increased to greater than one atmosphere absolute (atm abs). Current information indicates that pressurization should be at least 1.4 atm abs. This may occur in a single person chamber (monoplace) or multiplace chamber (may hold 2 or more people). Breathing 100% oxygen at 1 atm abs or exposing isolated parts of the body to 100% oxygen does not constitute HBO therapy.

UHMS has 15 approved uses for HBOT as of 2025:

1. Air or gas embolism;
2. Carbon monoxide poisoning including that complicated by cyanide poisoning;
3. Clostridal myositis and myonecrosis (gas gangrene);
4. Crush injury, compartment syndrome, and other acute traumatic ischemias;
5. Decompression sickness;
6. Central retinal artery occlusion and enhancement of healing in selected problem wounds due to insufficient arterial blood flow, including the diabetic foot;
7. Exceptional blood loss (anemia);
8. Intracranial abscess;
9. Necrotizing soft tissue infections (necrotizing fasciitis);
10. Osteomyelitis (refractory);
11. Delayed radiation injury (soft tissue and bony necrosis);
12. Skin grafts and flaps (compromised);
13. Thermal burns (early);
14. Idiopathic sudden sensorineural hearing loss;
15. Avascular necrosis

== Training ==
Medical training in Hyperbaric Medicine occurs through a post graduate medical fellowship. Hyperbaric medicine fellowships in the United States are approved by the Accreditation Council for Graduate Medical Education (ACGME) under the American Board of Preventive Medicine (ABPM), the American Board of Emergency Medicine (ABEM), and by the American Osteopathic Association under the American Osteopathic Association Bureau of Osteopathic Specialists (AOABOS). The UHMS provides a certificate of added qualification (CAQ) for physicians with an unrestricted license to practice medicine and for limited licensed practitioners, at the completion of the Program for Advanced Training in Hyperbaric Medicine (PATH).

Training and certification for hyperbaric technology is also offered by the National Board of Diving and Hyperbaric Medical Technology.

== Library ==
The UHMS Charles W. Shilling Library is the largest repository of diving and hyperbaric research and clinical information—current and historical—in the world. The library is located at the Duke University Medical Center (DUMC) Library in Durham, NC. The collection consists of books, journals, reports, workshops, symposia, conference proceedings, and annotated bibliographies spanning the fields of diving, hyperbaric, and marine medicine. There is a small journal and newsletter collection dealing with diving safety and diving medicine. The library has extensive reprint files of articles, cataloged by author, related to diving and hyperbaric medicine and dating back to the 1930s.

Many of the UHMS publications have been scanned and are available online at the Rubicon Research Repository. Other articles can be found in the DUMC Archive finding aids.
