= Diving medicine =

Diagnosis, treatment and prevention of disorders caused by underwater diving

Diving Medicine Physician
Occupation
- Names: Physician
- Occupation type: Specialty
- Activity sectors: Medicine

Description
- Education required: Doctor of Medicine (M.D.); Doctor of Osteopathic Medicine (D.O.); Bachelor of Medicine, Bachelor of Surgery (M.B.B.S./MBChB)
- Fields of employment: Hospitals, clinics

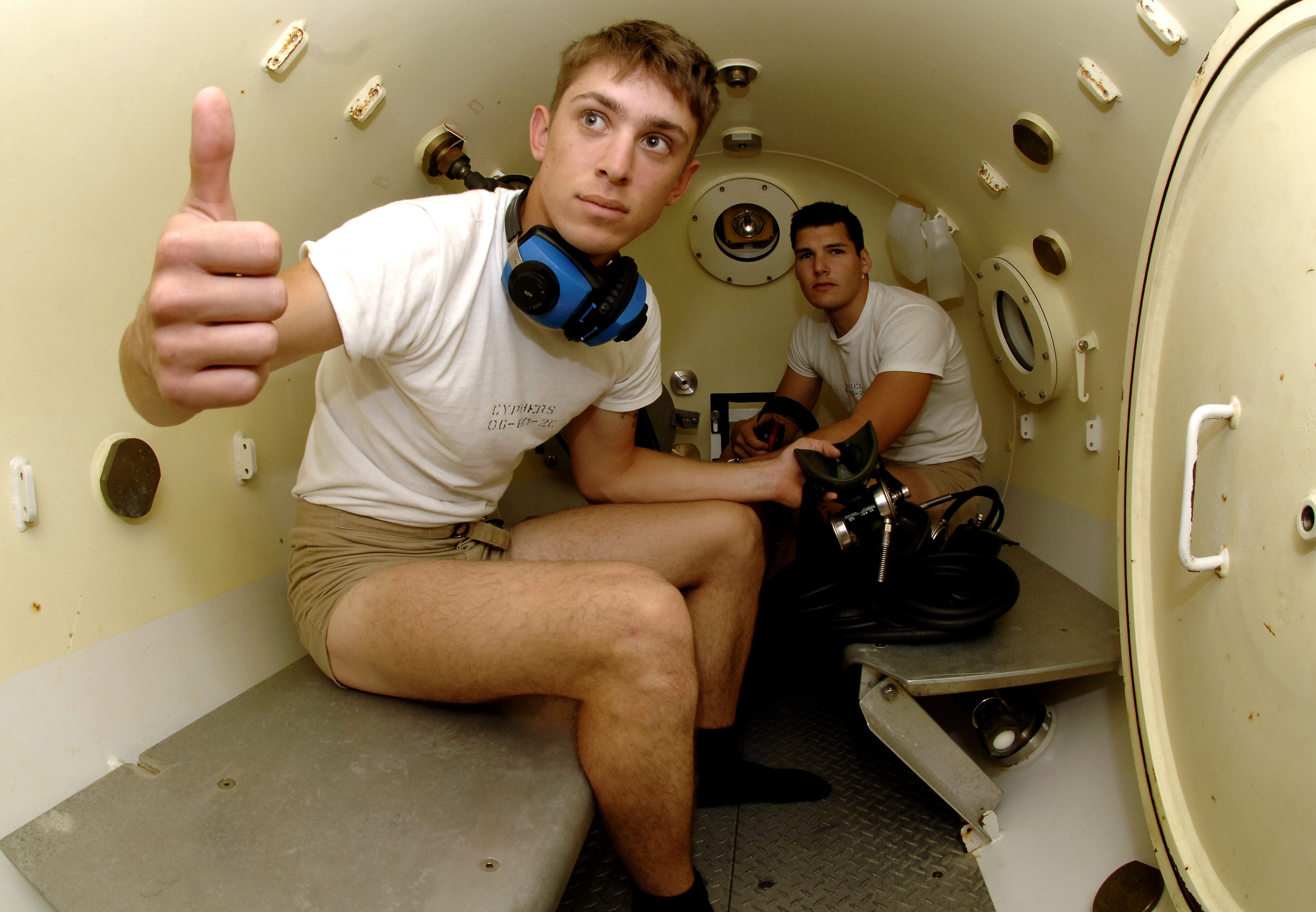
A recompression chamber is used to treat some diving disorders.

Diving medicine, also called undersea and hyperbaric medicine (UHB), is the diagnosis, treatment and prevention of conditions caused by humans entering the undersea environment. It includes the effects on the body of pressure on gases, the diagnosis and treatment of conditions caused by marine hazards and how aspects of a diver's fitness to dive affect the diver's safety. Diving medical practitioners are also expected to be competent in the examination of divers and potential divers to determine fitness to dive.

Hyperbaric medicine is a corollary field associated with diving, since recompression in a hyperbaric chamber is used as a treatment for two of the most significant diving-related illnesses, decompression sickness and arterial gas embolism.

Diving medicine deals with medical research on issues of diving, the prevention of diving disorders, treatment of diving accidents and diving fitness. The field includes the effect of breathing gases and their contaminants under high pressure on the human body and the relationship between the state of physical and psychological health of the diver and safety.

In diving accidents it is common for multiple disorders to occur together and interact with each other, both causatively and as complications.

Diving medicine is a branch of occupational medicine and sports medicine, and at first aid level, an important part of diver education.

== Range and scope of diving medicine ==
The scope of diving medicine must necessarily include conditions that are specifically connected with the activity of diving, and not found in other contexts, but this categorization excludes almost everything, leaving only deep water blackout, isobaric counterdiffusion and high pressure nervous syndrome. A more useful grouping is conditions that are associated with exposure to variations of ambient pressure. These conditions are largely shared by aviation and space medicine. Further conditions associated with diving and other aquatic and outdoor activities are commonly included in books which are aimed at the diver, rather than the specialist medical practitioner, as they are useful background to diver first aid training.

The scope of knowledge necessary for a practitioner of diving medicine includes the medical conditions associated with diving and their treatment, physics and physiology relating to the underwater and pressurised environment, the standard operating procedures and equipment used by divers which can influence the development and management of these conditions, and the specialised equipment used for treatment.

=== Scope of knowledge for diving medicine ===
The ECHM-EDTC Educational and Training Standards for Diving and Hyperbaric Medicine (2011) specify the following scope of knowledge for Diving Medicine:

- Physiology and pathology of diving and hyperbaric exposure.
  - Human physiology of underwater diving
  - Hyperbaric physics
  - Diving related physiology
  - Hyperbaric pathophysiology of immersion
  - Pathophysiology of decompression
  - A brief introduction to acute dysbaric disorders
  - Chronic dysbaric disorders
  - Hyperbaric oxygen therapy basis – Physiology and pathology
  - Oxygen toxicity
  - Pressure and inert gas effects
    - Nitrogen narcosis
    - High pressure neurological syndrome
  - Medication under pressure
  - Non-dysbaric diving pathologies
- Diving technology and safety
  - Basic safety planning
  - Compressed air work
  - Diving procedures
    - Wet bells and stages
    - Scuba diving on air and mixed gas
    - Surface supplied diving
    - Standard diving (copper helmet)
    - Rebreather diving (semi-closed and closed circuit)
    - Other diving procedures
  - Characteristics of various divers
  - Diving equipment as used to c.50m and chambers
  - Diving tables and computers
  - Regulations and standards for diving
  - Saturation diving
    - Saturation mode
    - Physiology of deep exposure
    - Compression
    - At depth in a living chamber
    - Bell excursions
- Fitness to dive
  - Fitness to dive criteria and contraindications for divers, compressed air workers and HBOT chamber personnel
  - Fitness to dive assessment
  - Fitness to dive standards (professional and recreational)
- Diving accidents
  - Diving incidents and accidents
  - Emergency medical support with no chamber on site
    - Barotrauma: ENT; dental; cutaneous, conjunctival, etc.
    - Physical injuries
  - Decompression illness
    - Pathophysiological basis and mechanisms of DCI
    - Differential diagnosis of decompression illness
    - Management of decompression incidents at the surface
    - Immediate management, recompression tables and strategies
  - Rehabilitation of disabled divers
  - Diving accident investigation
- Clinical HBO
  - Recompression chambers

=== Scope of knowledge for hyperbaric medicine ===
The ECHM-EDTC Educational and Training Standards for Diving and Hyperbaric Medicine (2011) specify the following scope of knowledge for Hyperbaric Medicine additional to that for Diving medicine:

- Physiology and pathology of diving and hyperbaric exposure.
  - HBO-Basics – effects of hyperbaric oxygen – physiology and pathology
- Clinical HBO
  - Chamber technique (multiplace, monoplace, transport chambers, wet recompression)
  - Mandatory indications
  - HBO Recommended indications
  - HBO Experimental and anecdotal indications
  - HBO Data collection / statistics / evaluation
  - HBO General basic treatment (nursing)
  - HBO Diagnostic, monitoring and therapeutic devices in chambers
  - Risk assessment, incidents monitoring and safety plan in HBO chambers
  - HBO Safety regulations

== Diagnostics ==
The signs and symptoms of diving disorders may present during a dive, on surfacing, or up to several hours after a dive. Divers have to breathe a gas which is at the same pressure as their surroundings, which can be much greater than on the surface. The ambient pressure underwater increases by 1 standard atmosphere (100 kPa) for every 10 metres (33 ft) of depth.

The principal conditions are: decompression illness (which covers decompression sickness and arterial gas embolism); nitrogen narcosis; high pressure nervous syndrome; oxygen toxicity; and pulmonary barotrauma (burst lung). Although some of these may occur in other settings, they are of particular concern during diving activities.

The disorders are caused by breathing gas at the high pressures encountered at depth, and divers will often breathe a gas mixture different from air to mitigate these effects. Nitrox, which contains more oxygen and less nitrogen is commonly used as a breathing gas to reduce the risk of decompression sickness at recreational depths (up to about 40 metres (130 ft)). Helium may be added to reduce the amount of nitrogen and oxygen in the gas mixture when diving deeper, to reduce the effects of narcosis and to avoid the risk of oxygen toxicity. This is complicated at depths beyond about 150 metres (500 ft), because a helium–oxygen mixture (heliox) then causes high pressure nervous syndrome. More exotic mixtures such as hydreliox, a hydrogen–helium–oxygen mixture, are used at extreme depths to counteract this.

=== Decompression sickness ===
Decompression sickness (DCS) occurs when gas, which has been breathed under high pressure and dissolved into the body tissues, forms bubbles as the pressure is reduced on ascent from a dive. The results may range from pain in the joints where the bubbles form to blockage of an artery leading to damage to the nervous system, paralysis or death. While bubbles can form anywhere in the body, DCS is most frequently observed in the shoulders, elbows, knees, and ankles. Joint pain occurs in about 90% of DCS cases reported to the U.S. Navy, with neurological symptoms and skin manifestations each present in 10% to 15% of cases. Pulmonary DCS is very rare in divers.

=== Pulmonary barotrauma and arterial gas embolism ===
If the breathing gas in a diver's lungs cannot freely escape during an ascent, the lungs may be expanded beyond their compliance, and the lung tissues may rupture, causing pulmonary barotrauma (PBT). The gas may then enter the arterial circulation producing arterial gas embolism (AGE), with effects similar to severe decompression sickness. Gas bubbles within the arterial circulation can block the supply of blood to any part of the body, including the brain, and can therefore manifest a vast variety of symptoms.

=== Nitrogen narcosis ===
Nitrogen narcosis is caused by the pressure of dissolved gas in the body and produces temporary impairment to the nervous system. This results in alteration to thought processes and a decrease in the diver's ability to make judgements or calculations. It can also decrease motor skills, and worsen performance in tasks requiring manual dexterity. As depth increases, so does the pressure and hence the severity of the narcosis. The effects may vary widely from individual to individual, and from day to day for the same diver. Because of the perception-altering effects of narcosis, a diver may not be aware of the symptoms, but studies have shown that impairment occurs nevertheless. The narcotic effects dissipate without lasting effect as the pressure decreases during ascent.

=== High-pressure nervous syndrome ===
Helium is the least narcotic of all gases, and divers may use breathing mixtures containing a proportion of helium for dives exceeding about 40 metres (130 ft) deep. In the 1960s it was expected that helium narcosis would begin to become apparent at depths of 300 metres (1,000 ft). However, it was found that different symptoms, such as tremors, occurred at shallower depths around 150 metres (500 ft). This became known as high-pressure nervous syndrome, and its effects are found to result from both the absolute depth and the speed of descent. Although the effects vary from person to person, they are stable and reproducible for the individual.

=== Oxygen toxicity ===
Although oxygen is essential to life, in concentrations significantly greater than normal it becomes toxic, overcoming the body's natural defences (antioxidants), and causing cell death in any part of the body. The lungs and brain are particularly affected by high partial pressures of oxygen, such as are encountered in diving. The body can tolerate partial pressures of oxygen around 0.5 bars (50 kPa; 7.3 psi) indefinitely, and up to 1.4 bars (140 kPa; 20 psi) for many hours, but higher partial pressures rapidly increase the chance of the most dangerous effect of oxygen toxicity, a convulsion resembling an epileptic seizure. Susceptibility to oxygen toxicity varies dramatically from person to person, and to a smaller extent from day to day for the same diver. Prior to convulsion, several symptoms may be present – most distinctly that of an aura.

== Treatments ==
Treatment of diving disorders depends on the specific disorder or combination of disorders, but two treatments are commonly associated with first aid and definitive treatment where diving is involved. These are first aid oxygen administration at high concentration, which is seldom contraindicated, and generally recommended as a default option in diving accidents where there is any significant probability of hypoxia, and hyperbaric oxygen therapy, which is the definitive treatment for most conditions of decompression illness.

=== Oxygen therapy ===
The administration of oxygen as a medical intervention is common in diving medicine, both for first aid and for longer term treatment. Normobaric oxygen administration at the highest available concentration is frequently used as first aid for any diving injury that may involve inert gas bubble formation in the tissues. There is epidemiological support for its use from a statistical study of cases recorded in a long term database.

=== Recompression and hyperbaric oxygen therapy ===
Recompression treatment in a hyperbaric chamber was initially used as a life-saving tool to treat decompression sickness in caisson workers and divers who stayed too long at depth and developed decompression sickness. In the 21st century, it is a highly specialized treatment modality found to be effective for treating many conditions where the administration of oxygen under pressure is beneficial.

Hyperbaric oxygen treatment is generally preferred when effective, as it is usually a more efficient and lower risk method of reducing symptoms of decompression illness, but in some cases recompression to pressures where oxygen toxicity is unacceptable may be required to eliminate the bubbles in the tissues in severe cases of decompression illness.

Availability of recompression treatment is limited. Some countries have no facilities at all, and in others which have facilities, such as the US, some hospitals do not make them available for emergency treatment.

== Medical examination for fitness to dive ==
Fitness to dive, (or medical fitness to dive), is the medical and physical suitability of a person to function safely in the underwater environment using underwater diving equipment and procedures. Depending on the circumstances it may be established by a signed statement by the diver that he or she does not suffer from any of the listed disqualifying conditions and is able to manage the ordinary physical requirements of diving, to a detailed medical examination by a physician registered as a medical examiner of divers following a procedural checklist, and a legal document of fitness to dive issued by the medical examiner.

The most important medical examination is the one before starting diving, as the diver can be screened to prevent exposure when a dangerous condition exists and a baseline established. The other important medicals are after some significant illness, where medical intervention is needed and has to be done by a doctor who is competent in diving medicine, and can not be done by prescriptive rules.

Psychological factors can affect fitness to dive, particularly where they affect response to emergencies, or risk taking behaviour. The use of medical and recreational drugs, can also influence fitness to dive, both for physiological and behavioural reasons. In some cases prescription drug use may have a net positive effect, when effectively treating an underlying condition, but frequently the side effects of effective medication may have undesirable influences on the fitness of diver, and most cases of recreational drug use result in an impaired fitness to dive, and a significantly increased risk of sub-optimal response to emergencies.

== Education and registration of practitioners ==
Specialist training in underwater and hyperbaric medicine is available from several institutions, and registration is possible both with professional associations and governmental registries.

=== Education ===
==== National Board of Diving and Hyperbaric Medical Technology ====
The National Board of Diving and Hyperbaric Medical Technology (NBDHMT), formally known as the National Association of Diving Technicians, is a non-profit organization for the education and certification of qualified personnel in the fields of diving and hyperbaric medicine in the US.

- The Diver Medic Technician (DMT) program is designed to meet the specific medical care needs of commercial, professional and scientific divers that often work in geographic isolation. DMT's are specifically trained for the various diving hazards found at remote work sites. The curriculum covers a wide range of topics from barotrauma to treatment of decompression sickness.
- The Certified Hyperbaric Technologist (CHT) program is tailored to meet the specific safety and operational needs for biomedical devices within the department, and the necessary knowledge and skills to administer clinical treatment. The curriculum covers a wide range of topics including hyperbaric chamber operations to transcutaneous oxygen monitoring.
- The Certified Hyperbaric Registered Nurse (CHRN) program is a subspecialty for registered nurses, sometimes referred to as baromedical nurses.

==== NOAA/UHMS Physicians Training Course in Diving Medicine ====
This course has been presented since 1977, and has been influenced by internationally accepted training objectives recommended by the Diving Medical Advisory Committee, the European Diving Technology Committee, and the European Committee for Hyperbaric Medicine. The course is designed for qualified medical practitioners, but may be useful to others who work in the field of diving safety and operations.

The course is to train physicians to recognize and treat diving medical emergencies. Subject matter includes:

- Basic physics and physiology of the hyperbaric environment:
  - the laws and principles;
  - the differences between hyperbaric and hypobaric pressure;
  - hyperbaric gases and their effects under pressure;
  - links between the physiological effects of the hyperbaric environment and the pathology of the disease
- Basic decompression theory:
  - historical development to current concepts
  - factors affecting decompression safety including acceptable risks and thermal issues
  - distinguish decompression sickness from barotrauma and arterial gas embolism;
- Dive computer theories and types, and comparison to dive tables
- Introduction to commercial diving and comparison to recreational and technical diving, including differences in procedures, equipment, and diver categories
- The clinical application of hyperbaric oxygen therapy and the treatment tables used;
- Participation in surface-supplied diving operation and hyperbaric chamber operations;
- Components, types, operational and safety hazards associated with hyperbaric chambers;
- Diving-related conditions resulting from the short and long-term effects of diving, flying after diving, altitude, thermal conditions, age and gender
- Neurologic assessment on a diver with signs and/or symptoms of DCI
- Medical and fitness standards for diving, including:
  - contraindications for both commercial and recreational divers
  - differences in medical standards for recreational versus occupational diving communities
  - legal implications for approving and denying fitness to dive in an occupational setting
  - approaches for determining the safety of prescription and OTC medications used by divers

==== Fellowship in Undersea and Hyperbaric Medicine ====
The Accreditation Council for Graduate Medical Education (ACGME) and the American Osteopathic Association (AOA) offer 12-month programs in undersea and hyperbaric medicine associated with ACGME or AOA accredited programs in emergency medicine, family medicine, internal medicine, occupational medicine, preventive medicine, or anesthesiology.

==== ECHM-EDTC Educational and Training Standards ====
The standard drawn up jointly by the European Committee for Hyperbaric Medicine and the European Diving Technical Committee defines job descriptions for several levels of diving and hyperbaric physician: Education and assessment to these standards may be provided by institutions of higher education under the leadership of a Level 3 Hyperbaric Medicine Expert as defined below. Certificates of competence may be issued by a nationally accredited institution or an internationally acknowledged agency, and periodic recertification is required.

Level 1. Medical Examiner of Divers (MED) minimum 28 teaching hours.

- The MED must be competent to perform the assessments of medical fitness to dive of occupational and recreational divers and compressed air workers, except the assessment of medical fitness to resume diving after major decompression incidents.

Level 2D. Diving Medicine Physician (DMP) minimum 80 teaching hours.

- A DMP must be competent to perform the initial and all other assessments of medical fitness to dive of working and recreational divers or compressed air workers, and manage diving accidents and advise diving contractors and others on diving medicine and physiology (with the backup of a diving medical expert or consultant).
- A DMP should have knowledge in relevant aspects of occupational health, but is not required to be a certified specialist in occupational medicine.
- A DMP should have certified skills and basic practical experience in assessment of medical fitness to dive, management of diving accidents, safety planning for professional diving operations, advanced life support, acute trauma care and general wound care.

Level 2H. Hyperbaric Medicine Physician (HMP) minimum 120 teaching hours

- An HMP will be responsible for hyperbaric treatment sessions (with the backup of a hyperbaric medicine expert or consultant)
- An HMP should have appropriate experience in anaesthesia and intensive care in order to manage the HBO patients, but is not required to be a certified specialist in anaesthesia and intensive care.
- An HMP must be competent to assess and manage clinical patients for hyperbaric oxygen therapy treatment

Level 3. Hyperbaric medicine expert or consultant (hyperbaric and diving medicine) is a physician who has been assessed as competent to:

- manage a hyperbaric facility (HBO centre) or the medical and physiological aspects of complex diving activities.
- manage research programs on diving medicine.
- supervise a team of HBO doctors and personnel, health professionals and others.
- teach relevant aspects of hyperbaric medicine and physiology to all members of staff.

==== Gesellschaft für Tauch- und Überdruckmedizin e. V. ====
Society for Diving and Hyperbaric medicine

German standards for education and assessment of diving medical practitioners are similar to the ECHM-EDTC Standards and are controlled by the Gesellschaft für Tauch- und Überdruckmedizin e. V. They include Medical Examiner of Divers, Diving Medicine Physician, Hyperbaric Medicine Physician, Chief Hyperbaric Medicine Physician and Hyperbaric Medicine Consultant.

==== Schweizerische Gesellschaft für Unterwasser- und Hyperbarmedizin ====
Swiss Society for underwater and hyperbaric medicine.

Swiss standards for education and assessment of diving medical practitioners are controlled by the Schweizerische Gesellschaft für Unterwasser- und Hyperbarmedizin. They include Medical Examiner of Divers, Diving Medicine Physician and Hyperbaric Medicine Physician.

==== Österreichische Gesellschaft für Tauch- und Hyperbarmedizin ====
Austrian Society for Diving and Hyperbaric medicine.

Austrian standards for education and assessment of diving medical practitioners are controlled by the Österreichische Gesellschaft für Tauch- und Hyperbarmedizin They include Medical Examiner of Divers, Diving Medicine Physician, Hyperbaric Medicine Physician, Chief Hyperbaric Medicine Physician and Hyperbaric Medicine Consultant.

=== Registration ===
The American Medical Association recognises the sub-speciality Undersea and Hyperbaric Medicine held by someone who is already Board Certified in some other speciality.

The South African Department of Employment and Labour registers two levels of Diving Medical Practitioner. Level 1 is qualified to conduct annual examinations and certification of medical fitness to dive, on commercial divers (equivalent to ECHM-EDTC Level 1. Medical Examiner of Divers), and Level 2 is qualified to provide medical advice to a diving contractor and hyperbaric treatment for diving injuries (equivalent to ECHM-EDTC Level 2D Diving Medicine Physician)

Australia has a four tier system: In 2007 there was no recognised equivalence with the European standard.

- GPs completing the first tier four- to five-day course on how to examine divers for 'fitness to dive' can then add their names to the SPUMS Diving Doctors List
- GPs completing the second tier two-week diving medicine courses provided by the Royal Australian Navy and the Royal Adelaide Hospital, or the two-week course in Diving and Hyperbaric Medicine provided by the ANZ Hyperbaric Medicine Group, qualify to do commercial-diving medicals.
- The third tier is the SPUMS Diploma in Diving and Hyperbaric Medicine. The candidate must attend a two-week course, write a dissertation related to DHM and have the equivalent of six months' full-time experience working in a hyperbaric medicine unit.
- The fourth tier is the Certificate in Diving and Hyperbaric Medicine from the ANZ College of Anaesthetists.

== Training of divers and support staff in relevant first aid ==
=== Divers ===
A basic knowledge understanding of the causes, symptoms and first aid treatment of diving related disorders is part of the basic training for most recreational and professional divers, both to help the diver avoid the disorders, and to allow appropriate action in case of an incident resulting in injury.

==== Recreational divers ====
A recreational diver has the same duty of care to other divers as any ordinary member of the public, and therefore there is no obligation to train recreational divers in first aid or other medical skills. Nevertheless, first aid training is recommended by most, if not all, recreational diver training agencies.

Recreational diving instructors and divemasters, on the other hand, are to a greater or lesser extent responsible for the safety of divers under their guidance, and therefore are generally required to be trained and certified to some level of rescue and first aid competence, as defined in the relevant training standards of the certifying body. In many cases this includes certification in cardiopulmonary resuscitation and first aid oxygen administration for diving accidents.

==== Professional divers ====
Professional divers usually operate as members of a team with a duty of care for other members of the team. Divers are expected to act as standby divers for other members of the team and the duties of a standby diver include rescue attempts if the working diver gets into difficulties. Consequently, professional divers are generally required to be trained in rescue procedures appropriate to the modes of diving they are certified in, and to administer first aid in emergencies. The specific training, competence and registration for these skills varies, and may be specified by state or national legislation or by industry codes of practice.

Diving supervisors have a similar duty of care, and as they are responsible for operational planning and safety, generally are also expected to manage emergency procedures, including the first aid that may be required. The level of first aid training, competence and certification will generally take this into account.

- In South Africa, registered commercial and scientific divers must hold current certification in first aid at the national Level 1, with additional training in oxygen administration for diving accidents, and registered diving supervisors must hold Level 2 first aid certification.
- Offshore diving contractors frequently follow the IMCA recommendations.

=== Diver medic ===
A diver medic or diving medical technician is a member of a dive team who is trained in advanced first aid.

A diver medic recognised by IMCA must be capable of administering first aid and emergency treatment, and carrying out the directions of a physician, and be familiar with diving procedures and compression chamber operation. The diver medic must also be able to assist the diving supervisor with decompression procedures, and provide treatment in a hyperbaric chamber in an emergency. The diver medic must hold, at a minimum, a valid certificate of medical fitness to operate in a pressurized environment, and a certificate of medical fitness to dive.

Training standards for diver medic are described in the IMCA Scheme for Recognition of Diver Medic Training.

== Ethical and medicolegal issues ==
Experimental work on human subjects is often ethically and/or legally impracticable. Tests where the endpoint is symptomatic decompression sickness are difficult to authorise and this makes the accumulation of adequate and statistically valid data difficult. The precautionary principle may be applied in the absence of information allowing a realistic assessment of risk. Analysis of investigations into accidents is useful when reliable results are available, which is less often than would be desirable, but privacy concerns prevent a large mount of information potentially useful to the general diving population from being made available to researchers.

== Long-term effects of underwater diving ==
Diving and other hyperbaric exposure has a well established connection with several acute conditions such as decompression illness and barotrauma. Recovery depends on the severity of the injury and the treatment, and is often complete. The possible long term health effects of diving are less known, particularly in cases where no clinical symptoms were recorded over the diver's career. Dysbaric osteonecrosis has long been associated with hyperbaric exposure requiring staged decompression, and has become a notifiable industrial disease.

Other conditions that affect quality of life associated with long term diving that have not been conclusively connected to the activity include persistent neurological abnormalities, reductions to lung function, accelerated hearing loss and accelerated cataract development.

Subclinical effects can occur without immediately noticeable presentations of decompression sickness, as is shown by dysbaric osteronecrosis and hearing deficiencies developing over the longer term in professional divers. Recreational divers may also be at risk for long term development of symptoms affecting the lungs, eyes, ears, and central nervous system.

Decompression illness has been studied since the condition was recognised, and as the methodology has improved, shortcomings in earlier studies have become apparent. One of the problems of much medical research on diving disorders is the lack of a control group to determine baseline function. Another is that there are few standardised techniques for diagnosis consistently used by the researchers at different centres, making comparisons of dubious validity.

Besides osteonecrosis and hearing losses, there is no substantial consensus about what the long term risks actually are, but the medical literature and anecdotal evidence both suggest that there are potential chronic long-term detrimental effects of diving. However evidence that recreational diving has a measurable effect on life expectancy is inconclusive.

=== Pulmonary function ===
In some cases, long term lung function change has been recorded after a single deep saturation dive.

Thorsen et al 1990 compared observations of saturation divers with matched controls, and found changes consistent with small airways dysfunction which suggested cumulative long term effects of diving exposure on lung function. The change in vital capacity was not considered to have a large effect on the diver's health, but shows that divers may develop some air flow obstruction by narrowing of the airways. The general tendency of reduction in pulmonary diffusion capacity with age may be increased in divers. These changes are associated with a decrease in exercise tolerance.

=== Vision ===
Exposure to hyperbaric oxygen may increase the risk of permanent changes to the lens of the eye, such as cataracts. The presence of nuclear cataracts and reversible myopic shift has been attributed to oxidative damage to the lens proteins. Myopic shifts are usually reversible and resolve within days to months, but cataracts are permanent and if sufficiently advanced will require lens replacement surgery. This is hypothesized to be an effect of lifetime accumulated exposure to oxygen.

=== Skeletal system ===
Dysbaric osteonecrosis (DON) has long been recognised as a long term health effect of diving and compressed air work. Survey results for these populations show variable incidence of DON. There seems to be a threshold of inert gas load or decompression stress needed to induce the condition, but the actual values remain obscure.

=== Hearing loss ===
There is evidence that deafness is more prevalent in divers, with loss at most frequencies compared to non-divers of the same age. Some divers are known to have hearing loss caused by acute barotraume, but there is also evidence of general hearing deterioration occurring faster than in non-divers, particularly in professional divers, probably due to high air flow noise levels in helmets and during chamber compression, and from noisy tools. Divers appear to be at greater risk for long term cochlear-vestibular damage and associated high frequency hearing loss.

=== Cardiovascular ===
A survey in 2017 of 768 former divers revealed that high blood pressure was more likely to be reported by divers who did not take a dive-free day after 3 days of strenuous diving. Divers with more than 150 professional dives per year or more than 2000 air dives per year were more likely to experience myocardial infarction or angina than divers with fewer than 50 professional dives per year, and less than 2000 air dives. They reached the conclusion that male former divers are more likely to experience these symptoms than the general population, but did not claim this to be specifically caused by diving, as it could have been a consequence of the associated strenuous physical activity.

=== Central nervous system ===
A 1991 study on saturation divers indicated significantly higher deficits in the central nervous system th the control group in the time span of one to seven years since their last deep dive. The symptoms included difficulties with attentional control (mental concentration) and paraesthesia in the feet and hands, abnormalities associated with lumbar spinal cord and more abnormal electroencephalograms than the control group. These abnormalities were correlated with deep diving, air diving, and saturation diving, and a history of decompression sickness.

However, though neurological effects are routinely observed during deep diving, and transient neurological effects occur in some divers after deep dives, more recent (2011) long term epidemiological studies give conflicting and inconclusive results, and more research is needed to resolve this issue.

Hemelryck et al (2014) conclude that while accident-free scuba diving may have some long term effects on short term memory, there is insufficient evidence to assume that general cognitive functions are affected.

== History of diving medical research ==
=== Timeline ===
- November 1992: The first examination for certification in Undersea Medicine by the American Board of Preventive Medicine.
- November 1999: The first examination for Undersea and Hyperbaric Medicine qualification.

=== Notable researchers ===
- Arthur J. Bachrach
- Albert R. Behnke
- Peter B. Bennett
- Thomas E. Berghage
- Paul Bert
- George F. Bond
- Alf O. Brubakk
- Albert A. Bühlmann
- Carl Edmonds
- William Paul Fife
- John Scott Haldane
- Robert William Hamilton Jr.
- Leonard Erskine Hill
- Brian Andrew Hills
- F.J. Keays
- Christian J. Lambertsen
- Joseph B. MacInnis
- Simon Mitchell
- Richard E. Moon
- František Novomeský
- John Rawlins
- Charles Wesley Shilling
- Edward D. Thalmann
- Richard D. Vann
- James Vorosmarti
- R.M. Wong
- Robert D. Workman

== Research organisations ==
Defence and Civil Institute of Environmental Medicine
DCIEM is a combined military and civilian research organisation to research the operational needs of the Canadian Forces in all environments.
Divers Alert Network
The Divers Alert Network (DAN) is an international non-profit organization with regional branches supported by donations, grants, and membership dues, for assisting divers in need. The DAN Research department conducts significant medical research on recreational scuba diving safety, and the DAN Medicine Department provides support for divers worldwide to find answers to their diving medical questions.
Diving Diseases Research Centre
The Diving Diseases Research Centre (DDRC) is a British hyperbaric medical organisation located near Derriford Hospital in Plymouth, Devon. It is a registered charity and was established in 1980 to research the effects of diving on human physiology. The main objective of DDRC is research into diving medicine. The Centre is also an education and training base providing diving medical, clinical and hyperbaric courses.
Diving Medical Advisory Council
DMAC is an independent committee with the purpose of providing advice about medical and safety aspects of commercial diving. They publish guidance notes about various aspects of diving and diving medical practice, and run a scheme for approval of courses in diving medicine.
European Committee for Hyperbaric Medicine
The ECHM is an organisation to study and define indications for hyperbaric therapy, research and therapy protocols, standards for therapeutic and technical procedures, equipment and personnel, and related cost-benefit and cost-effectiveness criteria. It is a representative body with the European health authorities, and works toward cooperation among scientific organizations involved in the field of Diving and Hyperbaric Medicine. Membership of the committee includes doctors practicing diving medicine in Northern Europe, representatives of relevant health authorities, medical representatives from relevant navies, and a diving safety officer nominated by the International Marine Contractors Association.
European Underwater and Baromedical Society
The European Underwater and Baromedical Society (EUBS) is a primary source of information for diving and hyperbaric medicine physiology worldwide. The organization was initially formed as the European Underwater and Biomedical Society in 1971.
Southern African Underswater and Hyperbaric Medical Association
SAUHMA is a voluntary association recognised as a Special Interest group by the Group Council of the South African Medical Association.
South Pacific Underwater Medicine Society

The South Pacific Underwater Medicine Society (SPUMS) is a primary source of information for diving and hyperbaric medicine physiology worldwide. The organisation supports the study of all aspects of underwater and hyperbaric medicine, provides information on underwater and hyperbaric medicine, publishes a medical journal and holds an annual conference.

SPUMS offers a post-graduate Diploma of Diving and Hyperbaric Medicine.
Undersea and Hyperbaric Medical Society
The Undersea and Hyperbaric Medical Society (UHMS) is a primary source of information for diving and hyperbaric medicine physiology worldwide.
US Navy Experimental Diving Unit
The functions of the Navy Experimental Diving Unit are to test and evaluate diving, hyperbaric, and other life-support systems and procedures, and to conduct research and development in biomedical and environmental physiology. NEDU also provides technical recommendations to the Naval Sea Systems Command to support operational requirements of the US armed forces.

== See also ==
- George F. Bond – US Navy physician and diving medicine and saturation diving researcher
- Rubicon Foundation – American non-profit foundation
- Undersea and Hyperbaric Medical Society – US based hyperbaric research organization
- Edward D. Thalmann – American hyperbaric medicine specialist (1945-2004)
