= Dysbarism =

Medical conditions resulting from changes in ambient pressure

- Specialty: Emergency medicine, diving medicine

Dysbarism or dysbaric disorders are medical conditions resulting from changes in ambient pressure. Various activities are associated with pressure changes. Underwater diving is a frequently cited example, but pressure changes also affect people who work in other pressurized environments (for example, caisson workers), and people who move between different altitudes. A dysbaric disorder may be acute or chronic.

== Ambient pressure ==
Ambient pressure on a diver is the pressure in the water around the diver (or the air, with caisson workers etc.). It is the sum of the atmospheric pressure at the surface and hydrostatic pressure due to the depth. As a diver descends, the ambient pressure increases. At 10 meters (33 feet) in seawater, it is twice the normal atmospheric pressure at the surface. At 40 meters (a common recommended limit for recreational diving) it is 5 times the pressure at sea level.

Pressure decreases with altitude above sea level, but less dramatically. At 3000 feet altitude (almost 1000 meters), the ambient pressure is almost 90% of sea level pressure. Ambient pressure does not drop to 50% of sea level pressure until 20,000 feet or 6,000 meters altitude.

== Effects of pressure on the body ==
=== Direct effects on tissues ===
This is usually not of practical importance, because the body is mostly composed of barely compressible materials such as water. Comression arthralgia is one of the few known conditions which may be a direct effect of pressure at depths where breathing of ambient pressure gas is feasible.

=== Gas filled spaces ===
Gas is very compressible. At survivable pressures most gases occupy a volume inversely proportional to the pressure. There are gas filled spaces in the human body such as the lungs, upper airway and the connected paranasal sinuses and middle ears, gas in the gastro-intestinal tract, and cavities in the teeth. In daily life the pressure in these spaces is usually exactly the same as the pressure outside, because the air spaces are connected to the outside world. If there is a pressure difference between the outside world and one of these air spaces, the air space will change volume as much as the surrounding tissues allow, after which the wall will be stretched painfully and may rupture.

=== Dissolved gas ===
Some of the gas breathed is dissolved in the blood supplied to the lungs and transported to the other tissues where, given sufficient time, it will reach equilibrium. If a person moves to a higher ambient pressure, then the gas inhaled is at a higher pressure, so more of it dissolves in the blood and diffuses into body tissues (Henry's and Fick's gas laws). If they slowly move back to a lower pressure, then the extra gas comes out slowly until they are back to their normal amount of dissolved gas. But if they move quickly to a lower ambient pressure, then the gas comes out of our blood and tissues violently, in large bubbles, in the same way that quickly removing the cap from a bottle of soft drink produces far more bubbles than slowly opening the bottle.

== Types of dysbarism ==
Dysbarism comprises several types of illness, some caused by increases in ambient pressure, and others by decreases in ambient pressure:

=== Decompression sickness (DCS) ===
Decompression sickness, also called caisson workers' disease and the bends, is the most well-known complication of underwater diving. It occurs when divers with enough gas dissolved in the tissues, ascend at a rate which allows the formation and growth of gas bubbles in the tissues which are sufficient to produce symptomatic tissue damage. This implies that the ascent is too fast or without doing necessary decompression stops. These bubbles are large enough and numerous enough to cause noticeable physical injury. It is possible that all divers have microbubbles in their blood to some extent during ascent, but that most of the time these bubbles are so few and so small that they cause no noticeable harm. When DCS occurs, bubbles disrupt tissues in the joints, brain, spinal cord, lungs, and other organs. Symptoms vary enormously depending on the site and extent of injury. DCS may be as subtle as unusual tiredness after a dive, or an aching elbow, or a mottled skin rash, or, it may present dramatically, with unconsciousness, seizures, paralysis, shortness of breath, or death. Paraplegia is possible.

=== Nitrogen narcosis ===
Nitrogen narcosis is also called “L’ivresse des grandes profondeurs” or "rapture of the deep". Nitrogen constitutes 78% of dry air, but at surface pressures it has no sedating effect. At greater depths, however, nitrogen affects the brain in the same way as nitrous oxide (also known as laughing gas) and other anaesthetic gases. The effect is similar to the effects of alcohol, and to some extent there is cross-tolerance. Unlike alcohol, the onset and disappearance are near instantaneous. A diver may be quite clear-headed at 20 meters, and yet giddy and silly at 30 meters. Ascending back to 20 meters will almost instantly clear the head with no direct after effects.

=== High-pressure nervous syndrome (HPNS) ===
High-pressure nervous syndrome (HPNS) – also known as high-pressure neurological syndrome, and helium tremors, is a neurological and physiological diving disorder which can result when a diver descends below about 500 feet (150 m) using a breathing gas containing a high proportion of helium. The effects experienced, and the severity of those effects, depend on the rate of descent, the depth and the percentage of helium. Symptoms of HPNS include tremors, myoclonic jerking, somnolence, EEG changes, visual disturbance, nausea, dizziness, and decreased mental performance.

=== Barotrauma ===
Barotrauma is injury caused by pressure effects on gas spaces. This may occur during ascent or descent. The ears are the most commonly affected body part. The most serious injury is lung barotrauma, which can result in pneumothorax, pneumomediastinum, pneumopericardium, subcutaneous emphysema, and arterial gas embolism. All divers, commercial air travelers, people traveling overland between different altitudes, and people who work in pressurized environments have had to deal with some degree of barotrauma effect upon their ears, sinuses, and other air spaces. At the most extreme, barotrauma can cause ruptured eardrums, bleeding sinuses, exploding tooth cavities, and the lung injuries described above. This is the reason why divers follow a procedure of not holding their breath during ascent. By breathing continuously, they keep the airways open and avoid pressure differences between their lungs and ambient pressure.

==== Arterial gas embolism (AGE) ====
Arterial gas embolism (AGE) is a complication of lung barotrauma of ascent. It occurs when breathing gas is introduced to the circulation on the arterial side via lung over-pressure trauma. AGE can present in similar ways to arterial blockages seen in other medical situations. Affected people may suffer strokes, with paralysis or numbness down one side; they may suffer heart attacks; they may suffer pulmonary embolism with shortness of breath and chest pain. It is often impossible to distinguish AGE from DCS, but luckily it is rarely necessary for physicians to be able to distinguish between the two, as treatment is the same. Sometimes AGE and DCS are lumped into a single entity, Decompression Illness (DCI). This problem does not normally occur on breathhold dives as the gas in the lungs will return to the volume it had at the start of the dive, and not expand further.

=== Classification ===
In addition to the foregoing, dysbarism is sometimes classified according to the source of the excess gas, with "trapped gas" dysbarism referring to the expansion of pockets that were already in a gaseous state in the body, and "evolved gas" dysbarism referring to gasses (primarily nitrogen or helium) dissolved in the body coming out of solution to form gas bubbles.

== Compression arthralgia ==
Compression arthralgia is pain in the joints caused by exposure to high ambient pressure at a relatively high rate of compression, experienced by underwater divers. It is also referred to in the U.S. Navy Diving Manual as compression pains.

Compression arthralgia has been recorded as deep aching pain in the knees, shoulders, fingers, back, hips, neck and ribs. Pain may be sudden and intense in onset and may be accompanied by a feeling of roughness in the joints.

Onset commonly occurs around 60 msw (meters of sea water), and symptoms are variable depending on depth, compression rate and personal susceptibility. Intensity increases with higher rates of compression and greater depth, and may be aggravated by exercise. Compression arthralgia is generally a problem of deep diving, and the slow compression rates possible in deep saturation diving, are not always sufficient to prevent it, and at sufficient depth even very slow compression may produce symptoms. Peter B. Bennett et al. (1974) found that the use of trimix breathing gas could reduce the symptoms, and there is some evidence the some hydrogen in the breathing gas may also reduce the effect.

== See also ==
- Diving disorders – Physiological disorders resulting from underwater diving
- Decompression sickness – Disorder caused by dissolved gases forming bubbles in tissues
- Diving hazards – Agents and situations that pose a threat to the underwater diver
- List of diving hazards and precautions – Hazards associated with underwater diving
- Dysbaric osteonecrosis – Ischemic bone disease caused by decompression bubbles
