= Diving disorders =

Physiological disorders resulting from underwater diving

Diving disorders, or diving related medical conditions, are conditions associated with underwater diving, and include both conditions unique to underwater diving, and those that also occur during other activities. This second group further divides conditions caused by exposure to ambient pressures significantly different from surface atmospheric pressure, and a range of conditions caused by general environment and equipment associated with diving activities.

Disorders particularly associated with diving include those caused by variations in ambient pressure, such as barotraumas of descent and ascent, decompression sickness and those caused by exposure to elevated ambient pressure, such as some types of gas toxicity. There are also non-dysbaric disorders associated with diving, which include the effects of the aquatic environment, such as drowning, which also are common to other water users, and disorders caused by the equipment or associated factors, such as carbon dioxide and carbon monoxide poisoning. General environmental conditions can lead to another group of disorders, which include hypothermia and motion sickness, injuries by marine and aquatic organisms, contaminated waters, man-made hazards, and ergonomic problems with equipment. Finally there are pre-existing medical and psychological conditions which increase the risk of being affected by a diving disorder, which may be aggravated by adverse side effects of medications and other drug use.

Treatment depends on the specific disorder, but often includes oxygen therapy, which is standard first aid for most diving accidents, and is hardly ever contra-indicated for a person medically fit to dive, and hyperbaric therapy is the definitive treatment for decompression sickness. Screening for medical fitness to dive can reduce some of the risk for some of the disorders.

== Effects of variation in ambient pressure ==
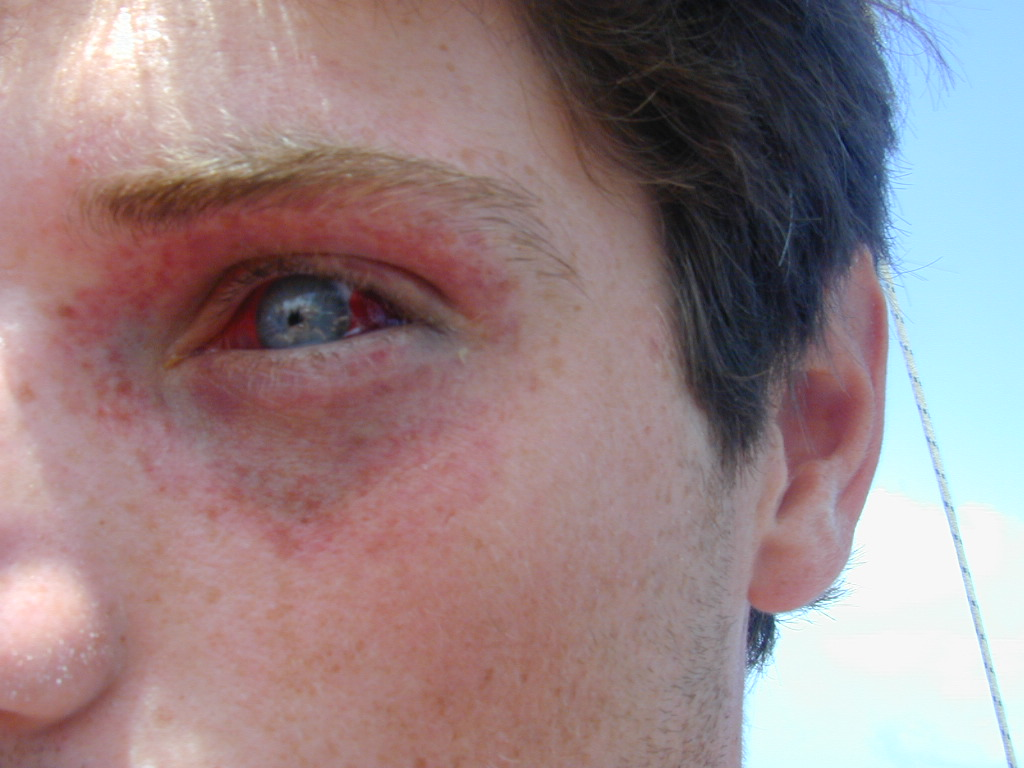
Mask squeeze barotrauma of descent

Many diving accidents or illnesses are related to the effect of pressure on gases in the body.

=== Barotrauma ===
Barotrauma is physical injury to body tissues caused by a difference in pressure between a gas space inside or in contact with the body, and the surroundings.

Barotrauma occurs when the difference in pressure between the surroundings and the gas space makes the gas change in volume, distorting adjacent tissues enough to rupture cells or damage tissue by deformation. A special case, where pressure in tissue is reduced to the level that causes dissolved gas to come out of solution as bubbles, is called decompression sickness, the bends, or caisson disease.

Several organs are susceptible to barotrauma; however, the cause is well understood and procedures for avoidance are clear. Nevertheless, barotrauma occurs and can be life-threatening, and procedures for first aid and further treatment are an important part of diving medicine.

Barodontalgia

- Barotraumas of descent (squeezes)
  - Ear squeeze (also alternobaric vertigo)
  - Sinus squeeze (aerosinusitis)
  - Tooth squeeze (dental barotrauma, barodontalgia)
  - Mask squeeze
  - Helmet squeeze
  - Suit squeeze
- Barotraumas of ascent (overexpansion injuries)
  - Lung overexpansion injury (pulmonary barotrauma) – rupture of lung tissue allowing air to enter tissues, blood vessels, or spaces between or surrounding organs:
    - Pneumothorax: Free air in the pleural cavity, leading to collapsed lung.
    - Interstitial emphysema: Gas trapped in the spaces between tissues.
    - Mediastinal emphysema: Gas trapped around the heart.
    - Subcutaneous emphysema: Free gas under the skin.
  - Arterial gas embolism: Air or other breathing gas in the blood stream, causing blockage of small blood vessels.
  - Intestinal gas overexpansion
  - Middle ear overpressure (reversed ear) (also alternobaric vertigo)
  - Sinus overpressure (aerosinusitis)
  - Tooth overpressure (dental barotrauma, barodontalgia)

=== Compression arthralgia ===
Compression arthralgia is pain in the joints caused by exposure to high ambient pressure at a relatively high rate of compression, experienced by underwater divers. Also referred to in the US Navy Diving Manual as compression pains. Fast compression (descent) may produce symptoms as shallow as 30 msw. At depths beyond 180m even very slow compression may produce symptoms. The pain may be sufficiently severe to limit the diver's capacity for work, and may also limit travel rate and depth of downward excursions by saturation divers. The symptoms generally resolve during decompression and require no further treatment.

=== Decompression sickness ===
Decompression sickness is a condition caused by dissolved gases coming out of solution as bubbles in the tissues and fluids of the body during and directly after depressurisation. DCS is best known as a hazard of underwater diving but may occur in other decompression events such as caisson work, flying in unpressurised aircraft, and extra-vehicular activity from spacecraft. Since bubbles can form in any part of the body, or migrate via the bloodstream to any part of the body, DCS can produce a wide range of symptoms, and its effects may vary from joint pain and skin rashes to paralysis and death.

Symptoms:

- Loss of bowel or bladder function
- Collapse or unconsciousness
- Coughing spasms or shortness of breath
- Dizziness
- Unusual fatigue
- Itching
- Joint aches or pain
- Mottling or marbling of skin
- Numbness or tingling
- Paralysis
- Personality changes
- Staggering, loss of coordination, or tremors
- Weakness

=== Dysbaric osteonecrosis ===
Dysbaric osteonecrosis, also known as aseptic bone necrosis, is generally a longer term effect on the bones and joints of divers caused by decompression bubbles and may occur even if no clinical decompression sickness has been diagnosed.

=== High pressure nervous syndrome ===
High-pressure nervous syndrome (HPNS) is a neurological and physiological diving disorder that results when a diver descends below about 500 feet (150 m) while breathing a helium–oxygen mixture. The effects depend on the rate of descent and the depth. The effects of HPNS comprise trembling, myoclonic jerks, drowsiness, alterations in EEG patterns, visual disruptions, queasiness, vertigo, and diminished cognitive function.

=== Nitrogen narcosis ===
Nitrogen narcosis is a reversible alteration in consciousness that occurs while breathing gas with a high partial pressure of nitrogen. The effect is similar to alcohol intoxication or nitrous oxide inhalation and does not usually become noticeable at nitrogen partial pressures less than about 3 bar, equivalent to a depth of about 30 meters (100 ft) on air. As depth increases, the mental impairment may become hazardous. Divers can learn to cope with some of the effects of narcosis, but it is impossible to develop a tolerance. Narcosis affects all divers breathing gas mixtures containing nitrogen, although susceptibility varies widely from dive to dive, and between individuals. One of the risks of Nitrogen narcosis is that divers may remove their regulator or fail to follow proper safety procedures.

=== Oxygen toxicity ===
Oxygen toxicity is a condition resulting from the harmful effects of breathing molecular oxygen (O_{2}) partial pressures significantly greater than found in atmospheric air at sea level. Severe cases can result in cell damage and death, with effects most often seen in the central nervous system, lungs and eyes.

Divers are exposed to raised partial pressures of oxygen in normal diving activities, where the partial pressure of oxygen in the breathing gas is increased in proportion to the ambient pressure at depth, and by using gas mixtures in which oxygen is substituted for inert gases to reduce decompression obligations, to accelerate decompression, or reduce the risk of decompression sickness.

They are also exposed to raised partial pressures of oxygen if given oxygen as first aid, which is a standard protocol for most acute diving related disorders, and when undergoing hyperbaric oxygen therapy in the case of decompression sickness or arterial gas embolism.

== Non-dysbaric disorders associated with diving ==
=== Drowning ===
"Drowning is the process of experiencing respiratory impairment from submersion/immersion in liquid".

Near drowning is the survival of a drowning event involving unconsciousness or water inhalation and can lead to serious secondary complications, including death, after the event. Drowning is usually the culmination of a deteriorating sequence of events in a diving accident, and is seldom a satisfactory explanation for a fatality, as it fails to explain the underlying causes and complications that led to the final consequence. Generally, a diver is well prepared for the environment, and well trained and equipped to deal with it. A diver should not drown merely as a result of being in the water.

=== Salt water aspiration syndrome ===
Salt water aspiration syndrome is a rare diving disorder experienced by divers who inhale a mist of seawater from a faulty demand valve causing irritation of the lungs. It can usually be treated by rest for several hours. If severe, medical assessment is required.

=== Hypoxia ===
Hypoxia is a pathological condition in which the body as a whole or a region of the body is deprived of adequate oxygen supply. Variations in arterial oxygen concentrations can be part of the normal physiology, for example, during strenuous physical exercise. A mismatch between oxygen supply and its demand at the cellular level may result in a hypoxic condition.

Generalized hypoxia occurs when breathing mixtures of gases with a low oxygen content, e.g. while diving underwater especially when using closed-circuit rebreather systems that control the amount of oxygen in the supplied air, or when breathing gas mixtures blended to prevent oxygen toxicity at depths below about 60 m near or at the surface. This condition may lead to a loss of consciousness underwater and consequent death either directly by cerebral hypoxia, or indirectly by drowning.

Latent hypoxia may occur when a breathhold diver surfaces. This is also known as deep water blackout. The consequence is likely to be drowning.

Tissue hypoxia occurs when arterial gas emboli due to either lung overexpansion injury or decompression sickness block systemic capillaries and shut off the supply of oxygenated blood to the tissues downstream. If untreated, this leads to tissue damage or death, with consequences that depend on the site and extent of the injury.

=== Swimming-induced pulmonary edema ===
Swimming-induced pulmonary edema (SIPE) occurs when fluids from the blood leak abnormally from the small vessels of the lung (pulmonary capillaries) into the airspaces (alveoli).

SIPE usually occurs during heavy exertion in conditions of water immersion, such as swimming and diving. It has been reported in scuba divers, apnea (breath hold) free-diving competitors, combat swimmers, and triathletes. The causes are incompletely understood at the present time.

=== Immersion diuresis ===
Immersion diuresis is a type of diuresis caused by immersion of the body in water (or equivalent liquid). It is mainly caused by lower temperature and by pressure.

The temperature effect is caused by vasoconstriction of the cutaneous blood vessels within the body to conserve heat. The body detects an increase in the blood pressure and inhibits the release of vasopressin, causing an increase in the production of urine.

The pressure effect is caused by the hydrostatic pressure of the water directly increasing blood pressure. Its significance is indicated by the fact that the temperature of the water doesn't substantially affect the rate of diuresis. Partial immersion of only the limbs does not cause increased urination.

Diuresis is significant in diving medicine as the consequent mild dehydration may be a contributing factor in the onset of decompression sickness.

=== Hypercapnia ===
Hypercapnia is a condition where there is too much carbon dioxide (CO_{2}) in the blood.

Divers may develop this condition for several possible reasons:

- Increased work of breathing due to increased density of the breathing das with depth.
- Inadequate ventilatory response to exertion.
- Dead space of the breathing apparatus.
- Higher inspired CO_{2} due to failure of the carbon dioxide scrubber in the diver's rebreather to remove sufficient carbon dioxide from the loop.
- Over-exertion, producing excess carbon dioxide due to elevated metabolic activity.
- Deliberate hypoventilation, known as "skip breathing".
- Shallow breathing, due to stress or other reasons.
- Contamination of the breathing gas supply.

As severe hypercapnia may produce disorientation, panic, hyperventilation, convulsions, unconsciousness, and eventually death. it is important for divers, supervisors and life support technicians to recognise the symptoms and development of the condition in time to correct the situation.

=== Carbon monoxide poisoning ===
Carbon monoxide poisoning occurs by inhalation of carbon monoxide (CO). Carbon monoxide is a toxic gas, but, being colorless, odorless, tasteless, and initially non-irritating, it is very difficult for people to detect. Carbon monoxide is a product of incomplete combustion of organic matter due to insufficient oxygen supply to enable complete oxidation to carbon dioxide (CO_{2}). Breathing gas for diving may be contaminated either by intake of contaminated atmospheric air, usually from internal combustion exhaust gases, or, more rarely, by carbon monoxide produced in the compressor by partial combustion of lubricants.

The effects of carbon monoxide in breathing gas are increased in proportion to the depth, as the partial pressure of the contaminant is increased in proportion to the depth for a given gas fraction. The permitted levels of carbon monoxide in breathing gas for diving is lower than for at atmospheric pressure due to the concentrating effect of raised ambient pressure.

=== Lipid pneumonia ===
Lipid pneumonia is a specific form of lung inflammation (pneumonia) that develops when lipids enter the bronchial tree. In diving this can happen when the breathing gas supply is contaminated with lubricants from the compressor, but it is very rare.

=== Environmental hazards ===
Hazards in the underwater environment that can affect divers include marine life, marine infections, polluted water, ocean currents, waves and surges and man-made hazards such as boats, fishing lines and underwater construction. Diving medical personnel need to be able to recognize and treat accidents from large and small predators and poisonous creatures, appropriately diagnose and treat marine infections and illnesses from pollution as well as diverse maladies such as sea sickness, traveler's diarrhea and malaria.

==== Hypothermia ====
Hypothermia is a condition in which core temperature drops below the required temperature for normal metabolism and body functions (Clinical hypothermia is defined as below 35.0 °C (95.0 °F)). Body temperature is usually maintained near a constant level of 36.5–37.5 °C (97.7–99.5 °F) through biological homeostasis or thermoregulation. If exposed to cold and the internal mechanisms are unable to replenish the heat that is being lost, a drop in core temperature occurs. As body temperature decreases, characteristic symptoms occur such as shivering and mental confusion.

Hypothermia usually occurs from exposure to low temperatures, but any condition that decreases heat production, increases heat loss, or impairs thermoregulation may contribute. Heat is lost more quickly in water than on land, and also more quickly in proportion to wind speed. Water temperatures that would be quite reasonable as outdoor air temperatures can lead to hypothermia. Divers are often exposed to low water temperatures and wind chill, which may be aggravated by evaporative cooling of wet dive suits, and mild hypothermia is not uncommon in both recreational and professional divers, while moderate to severe hypothermia remains a significant risk.

Clinical hypothermia (defined by a drop in core temperature below 35 °C) is unusual during the dive in scuba divers wearing reasonable thermal protection, as even a leaking dry suit reduces heat loss considerably.

In deep diving, where the gas density is relatively high, the heat loss to breathing gas can be a large part of the total heat loss, and can by itself exceed the metabolic heat production, making it necessary to heat the gas supply before inhalation. The peripheral vasoconstriction that occurs when the skin is chilled does not protect against heat loss from the lungs. Helium has a lower heat capacity than nitrogen, but a higher thermal conductivity. It has several advantages as a breathing gas at high pressures, but disadvantages as an ambient atmosphere in diving bells and dry suits, where heat loss through the surrounding gas is increased.

==== Non-freezing cold injuries ====
Exposure of the extremities in water temperatures below 12 °C (53.6 °F) can cause permanent damage. NFCI is a class of tissue damage caused by sustained exposure to low temperature without actual freezing. Experimental evidence suggests a complex mode of injury with microvascular disruption, cyclic ischaemia, reperfusion injury and direct damage to nerves due to cold.

==== Frostbite ====
Tissue damage by freezing of the extremities is a hazard of ice diving, mainly when the diver is on the ice after the dive, and particularly if there is wind chill.

==== Hyperthermia ====
Overheating may occur on the surface when the diver is preparing to dive, or on standby in heavily insulated exposure suit, or in the water, if the suit is excessively insulated for the conditions, the water temperature is too high, or the supply to a hot water suit is too hot.

==== Seasickness ====
Seasickness is a form of motion sickness, a condition in which a disagreement exists between visually perceived movement and the vestibular system's sense of movement characterized by a feeling of nausea and, in extreme cases, vertigo, experienced after spending time on a craft on water, floating at the surface of a rough sea, and in strong surge near the bottom.

Seasickness can significantly reduce the ability of a diver to effectively complete a task or manage a contingency, and may predispose the diver to hypothermia and decompression sickness.

=== Cramps ===
A cramp is a sudden, involuntary, painful muscle contraction or overshortening; while generally temporary and non-damaging, they can cause significant pain and a paralysis-like immobility of the affected muscle. Muscle cramps are common and are often associated with pregnancy, physical exercise or overexertion, age (common in older adults), or may be a sign of a motor neuron disorder.

Cramps may occur in a skeletal muscle or smooth muscle. Skeletal muscle cramps may be caused by muscle fatigue or a lack of electrolytes such as sodium (a condition called hyponatremia), potassium (called hypokalemia), or magnesium (called hypomagnesemia). Some skeletal muscle cramps do not have a known cause. Cramps of smooth muscle may be due to menstruation or gastroenteritis. Motor neuron disorders (e.g., amyotrophic lateral sclerosis), metabolic disorders (e.g., liver failure), some medications (e.g., diuretics and inhaled beta‐agonists), and haemodialysis may also cause muscle cramps.

A cramp usually starts suddenly and it also usually goes away on its own over a period of several seconds, minutes, or hours.

=== Injury caused by marine animals ===
==== Envenomation ====
Injuries from venomous animals, which may result from skin contact with mobile or sessile cnidarians such as jellyfish and hydroids, puncture wounds caused by inadvertent impact with cryptic species such as stonefish or active defense by species such as stingrays and lionfish.

==== Bites ====
Injuries from bites usually occur when marine animals defend themselves or their territory from encroachment or perceived aggression by divers. Occasionally divers may be bitten by an animal mistaking part of the diver for food. This may occur when animals are fed by divers.

==== Blunt trauma ====
Injuries caused by impact with a large animal or part of a large animal, often apparently inadvertently, and resulting from the diver approaching closely to the animal, which may be startled, or simply proceeding on its way. This can happen when divers get too close to large sharks or cetaceans, not necessarily intentionally.

=== Marine microbial infection ===
Microbes can infect through injured skin, the mucosa, or inhalation. Nonfatal drowning in marine environments brings seawater into the lungs where the water goes through our nose or through the mouth resulting in pneumonia. Aerosolized water can contain algal toxins and can result in viruses to become airborne. Infectious diseases are predominantly caused by pathogens which are viruses, bacteria, fungi and protist parasites.

=== Contamination from polluted waters ===
In most places, contamination comes from a variety of sources (non-point source pollution). In a few it is primarily pollution from a single industrial source. The more immediate threat is from locations where high concentrations of toxic or pathogenic pollutants are present, but lower concentrations of less immediately harmful contaminants can have a longer term influence on the diver's health. Three major categories of contamination can cause health and safety problems for divers. These are biological, chemical and radioactive materials.

The risks from hazardous materials are generally proportional to dosage - exposure time and concentration, and the effects of the material on the body. This is particularly the case with chemical and radiological contaminants. There may be a threshold limit value which will not usually produce ill effects over long-term exposure. Others may have a cumulative effect.

The United Nations identification numbers for hazardous materials classifies hazardous materials under 9 categories:

1. Explosives
2. Gases, which may be compressed, liquified or dissolved under pressure
3. Flammable liquids
4. Flammable solids
5. Oxidising agents
6. Poisonous and infectious substances
7. Radioactive substances
8. Corrosive substances
9. Miscellaneous hazardous substances

A contaminant may be classed under one or more of these categories.

Poisonous substances are also classified in 9 categories:

1. Irritants
2. Simple asphyxiants
3. Blood asphyxiants
4. Tissue asphyxiants
5. Respiratory paralysers
6. Liver and kidney toxins
7. Substances that affect the muscles (myotoxins)
8. Substances that affect bone marrow
9. Substances that interfere with nerve function (neurotoxins)

=== Trauma due to the natural physical environment ===
Water movement due to waves or currents may wash the diver against hard or sharp edged obstacles, or the movement of the diver may cause impact, or unstable bottom formations may fall onto the diver, causing injury.

=== Injuries caused by man-made hazards ===
In addition to mechanisms similar to those for natural hazards, injuries caused by impact with the dive boat or other vessels or their moving parts, like propellers and thrusters, and by tools and equipment is possible. The nature of work related injury depends on the task and equipment in use.

=== Disorders caused by the diving equipment ===
A variety of disorders may be caused by ergonomic problems due to poorly fitting equipment.

- Temporomandibular joint dysfunction is pain or tenderness in the jaw, headache or facial ache caused by gripping the regulator mouthpiece between the teeth of the upper and lower jaws. This action is required to retain the mouthpiece in place for the duration of the dive, and may strain the masticatory muscles or the temporomandibular joint, which is where the lower jawbone (mandible) hinges on the skull at the temporal bone. This problem can be aggravated by cold water, stress, and strong water movement, and can be reduced by use of custom mouthpieces with longer and more rigid bite grip surfaces, which allow better support of the second stage with less effort.
- Leg and foot cramps may be caused by unaccustomed exercise, cold, or ill-fitting fins.
- Lower back pain may be caused by a heavy weightbelt hanging from the small of the back, counteracting the buoyancy of the diving suit which is distributed over the full length of the diver. This effect can be reduced by use of integrated weight systems which support the weights over the length of the back on the diving harness backplate.
- Restricted circulation to the hands may be caused by excessively tight dry suit cuff seals.

== Treatment ==
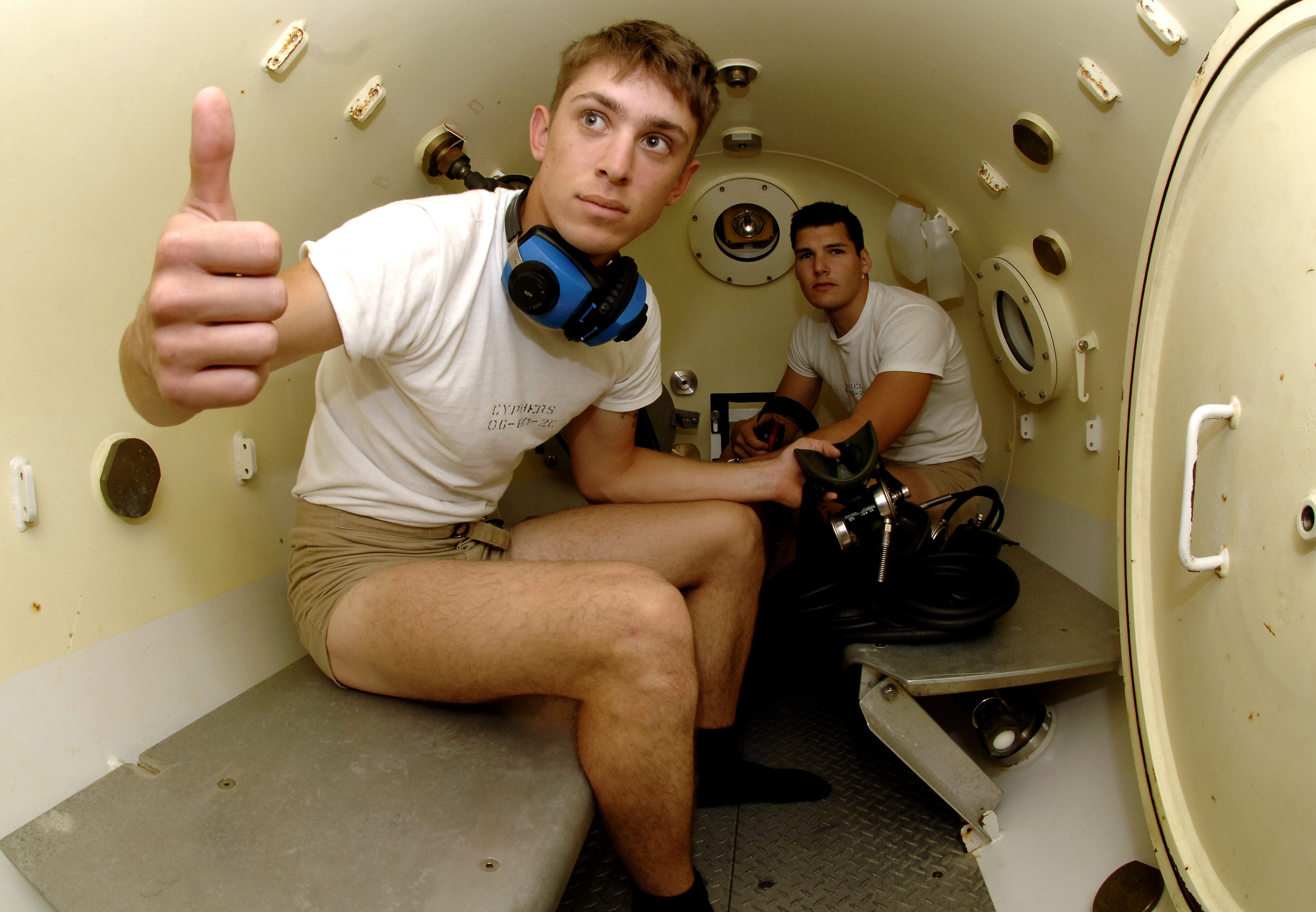
Decompression chamber

Treatment of diving disorders depends on the specific disorder or combination of disorders, but two treatments are commonly associated with first aid and definitive treatment where diving is involved. These are first aid oxygen administration at high concentration, which is seldom contraindicated, widely available, and generally recommended as a default option in diving accidents where there is any significant probability of hypoxia, and hyperbaric oxygen therapy (HBO), which is the definitive treatment for most incidences of decompression illness. Hyperbaric treatment on other breathing gases is also used for treatment of decompression sickness if HBO is inadequate. Hyperbaric treatment facilities may not be available within a useful distance of a dive site.

=== Oxygen therapy ===
The administration of oxygen as a medical intervention is common in diving medicine, both for first aid and for longer-term treatment.

=== Hyperbaric therapy ===
Recompression treatment in a hyperbaric chamber was initially used as a life-saving tool to treat decompression sickness in caisson workers and divers who stayed too long at depth and developed decompression sickness. Now, it is a highly specialized treatment modality that has been found to be effective in the treatment of many conditions where the administration of oxygen under pressure has been found to be beneficial. Studies have shown it to be quite effective in some 13 indications approved by the Undersea and Hyperbaric Medical Society.

Hyperbaric oxygen treatment is generally preferred when effective, as it is usually a more efficient and lower risk method of reducing symptoms of decompression illness, However, in some cases recompression to pressures where oxygen toxicity is unacceptable may be required to eliminate the bubbles in the tissues that cause the symptoms.In these cases other breathing gas gases such as air, nitrox, heliox, or trimix may be used.

== Fitness to dive ==
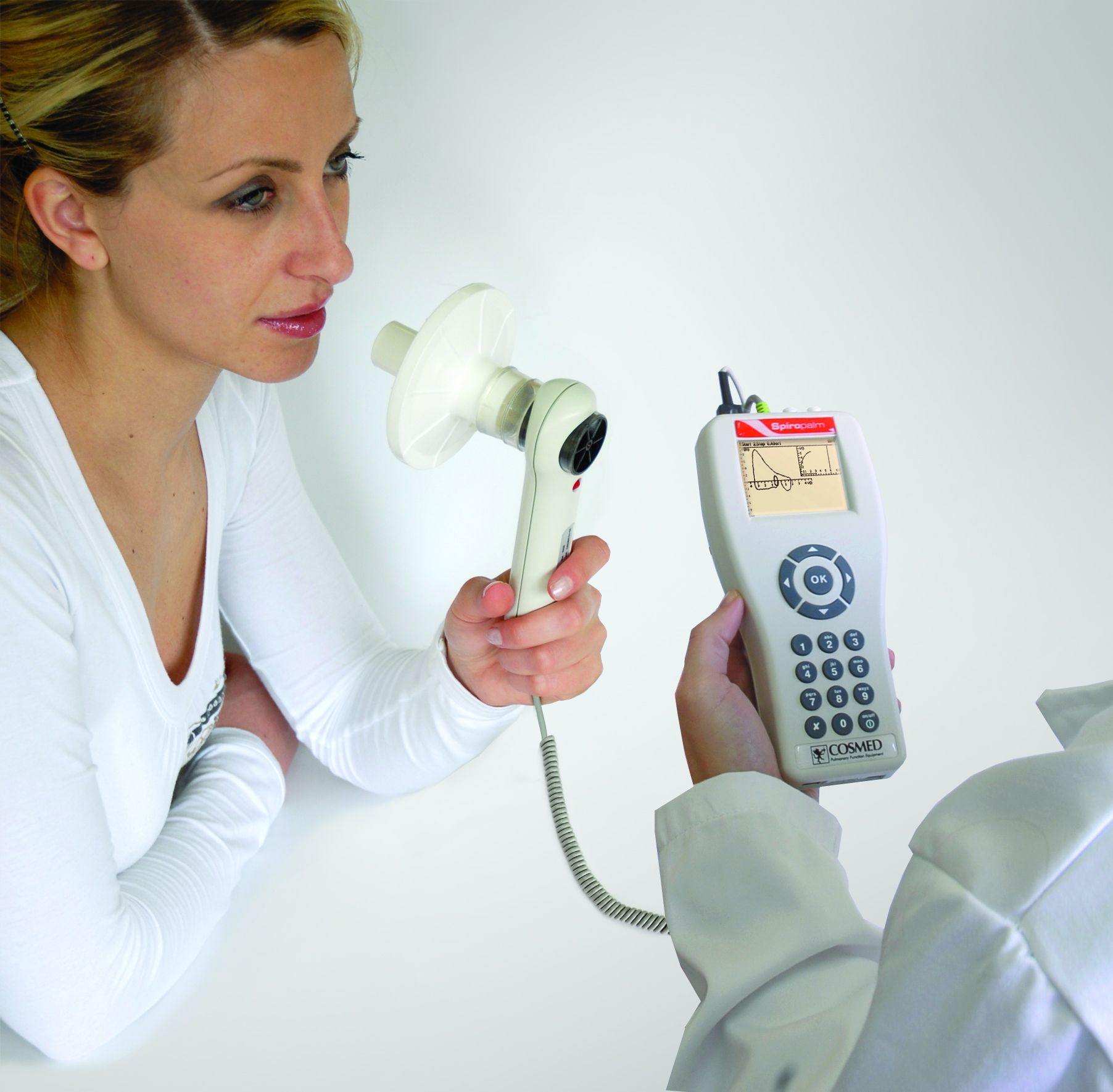
Hand held spirometer with display and transducer

All divers should be free of conditions and illnesses that would negatively impact their safety and well-being underwater. The diving medical physician should be able to identify, treat and advise divers about illnesses and conditions that would cause them to be at increased risk for a diving accident.

Some reasons why a person should not be considered fit to dive are as follows:

- Disorders that lead to altered consciousness: conditions that produce reduced awareness or sedation from medication, drugs, marijuana or alcohol; fainting, heart problems and seizure activity.
- Disorders that substantially increase the risk of barotrauma injury conditions or diseases that are associated with air trapping in closed spaces, such as sinuses, middle ear, lungs and gastrointestinal tract. Severe asthma is an example.
- Disorders that may lead to erratic and irresponsible behavior: included here would be immaturity, psychiatric disorders, diving while under the influence of medications, drugs and alcohol or any medical disorder that results in cognitive defects.

Conditions that may increase risk of diving disorders, but are not necessarily absolute contraindications:

- Patent foramen ovale
- Diabetes mellitus — No serious problems should be expected during dives due to hypoglycaemia in divers with well-controlled diabetes. Long-term complications of diabetes should be considered and may be a contraindication.
- Asthma

Conditions considered temporary reasons to suspend diving activities:

- Pregnancy—It is unlikely that literature research can establish the effect of scuba diving on the unborn human fetus as there is insufficient data, and women tend to comply with the diving industry recommendation not to dive while pregnant.

== Long-term health effects of diving ==
Decompression sickness and some barotraumas can have long-term health effects, but even subclinical injuries may in some cases have long-term health effects.

Dysbaric osteonecrosis is ischemic bone disease thought to be caused by decompression bubbles, though the definitive pathologic process is poorly understood. It is a significant occupational hazard, which may follow a single exposure to compressed air, and may occur with no history of DCS, but is usually associated with significant compressed air exposure. The distribution of lesions differs with the type of exposure - the juxta-articular lesions being more common in caisson workers than in divers. There is a definite relationship between length of time exposed to extreme depths and the percentage of divers with bone lesions. Evidence does not suggest that dysbaric osteonecrosis is a significant risk in recreational scuba diving.

Exposure to increased partial pressure of oxygen during diving can raise the level of oxidative stress in which increased production of free radicals can occur. The combined influence of diving-related factors on free radical production and the long-term effects on diver resilience and health are not yet understood. Diving, and other forms of exercise, can precondition individuals for protection in further dives. It is not yet known if this preconditioning can influence resilience in other environmental extremes. Cumulative exposure to high partial pressure of oxygen is known to accelerate the development of cataracts, a visual disorder that affects most people who live long enough. This is most likely in technical divers, saturation divers, and anyone who is treated with hyperbaric oxygen on several occasions.

The mortality rate in recreational diving is very low, and the risk of accidental drowning is unlikely to have a significant influence on the average life expectancy of divers. Risk of accidental drowning and other diving accidents can be reduced by following safe diving practices.

Permanent hearing deficits can be caused by high ambient noise levels in commercial diving, by middle and inner ear barotrauma, and by inner ear decompression sickness.

Other forms of lasting neurological damage can follow decompression sickness involving the nervous system.

A British study on former commercial divers showed a possible link between some cardiovascular disease symptoms and frequency of working dives, but it is not clear from the data whether the association is linked to diving per se or to strenuous physical activity during working dives.

There is some evidence that there are long term effects on pulmonary function from deep commercial diving. These include accelerated reduction in lung function and development of small airways disease. There is also evidence that most scuba diving does not produce long term harm to lung function. Changes in lung function following normal scuba diving are generally small with a low chance of clinical significance, and there does not appear to be evidence of general accelerated long term loss of lung function in the majority of recreational and military divers, but there may be such effects in particularly susceptible subjects, even after relatively minor exposure.
