= Robert William Hamilton Jr. =

American physiologist

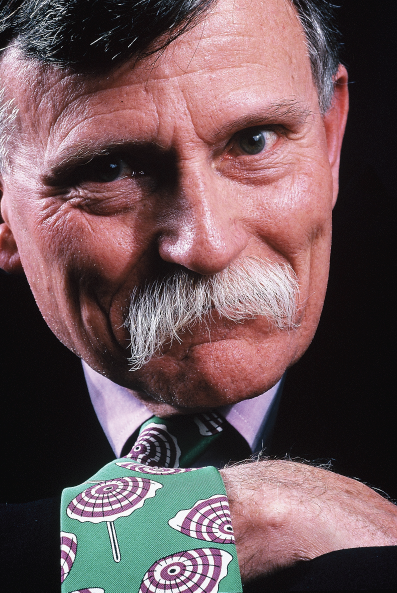
- Born: 1930; Midland, Texas
- Died: 2011-09-16 aged 81
- Spouse: Kathryn (Faulkner)

Robert William Hamilton Jr. (1930 – 16 September 2011), known as Bill, was an American physiologist known for his work in hyperbaric physiology.

== Family ==
He was predeceased by his first wife Beverly, son Beto and daughter Kitty.

He was survived by his wife Kathryn (née Faulkner) of nearly 40 years, daughters Lucy and Sally, grandsons, Felix, Bobby, Zach, Tyler and Truman.

== Education ==
He earned his degree in liberal arts at the University of Texas, followed by a master's degree in animal reproductive biology at Texas A&M.

He earned his Doctoral degree in physiology and biophysics in 1964 from the University of Minnesota.

== Military service ==
Hamilton served as a fighter pilot in the U.S. Air Force in the Korean War and Vietnam, earning the rank of major. He was also awarded the Distinguished Flying Cross, Air Medal, and other decorations.

He helped solve equipment problems on unsuccessful bailouts as a Life Support Officer, which earned him a National Academy of Sciences recommendation to NASA as a Scientist Astronaut.

== Underwater sciences ==
Hamilton left the Air Force with and moved to Buffalo, New York, in 1964, where he met Heinz Schreiner and began his work on the undersea world as a scientist and director of the Ocean Systems environmental physiology and diving research lab in Tarrytown, New York.

=== Research ===
Hamilton investigated the effects of gases in hyperbaric and hypobaric environments which led to the development of decompression modelling tools and operational procedures for divers, astronauts, hyperbaric chambers, and tunnel and caisson workers. He was both the physiologist and test subject on the first manned laboratory saturation diving to the continental shelf pressure of 12 ATA (200 msw) in 1965.

He founded Hamilton Research, Ltd. (1976), for decompression and hyperbaric research, which developed procedures and techniques to mitigate the effects of high pressure neurological syndrome and the Diving Computational Analysis Program (DCAP), which he co-developed with David J. Kenyon.

Hamilton was the principal investigator of the NOAA Repex oxygen exposure tables to assist divers in avoiding oxygen toxicity. These became the basis for most oxygen exposure calculation methods used for saturation and repetitive diving exposures to oxygen in breathing mixtures.

In the late 1980s, he developed project-specific custom decompression tables. His work with decompression tables, physiological effects of gases, and methods of managing exposure to oxygen, helped to open up the new field of technical diving. This included work with the National Oceanographic and Atmospheric Administration (NOAA) developing "Monitor Mix" breathing gas for dives to the USS Monitor. This breathing gas became NOAA Trimix I, with decompression tables designed by Bill Hamilton published in the NOAA Diving Manual.

== Publications ==
R.W. Hamilton contributed to, and authored, a large number of scientific and technical papers, reports, and diving medical and safety workshop Proceedings. Some of these are listed here:

- Hamilton, Robert W; Thalmann, Edward D. (2003). "10.2: Decompression Practice". In Brubakk, Alf O.; Neuman, Tom S (eds.). Bennett and Elliott's physiology and medicine of diving (5th Revised ed.). United States: Saunders. pp. 455–500. ISBN 0-7020-2571-2. OCLC 51607923.
- Hamilton Jr, R.W.; Rogers, R.E.; Powell, M.R. (1994). Development and validation of no-stop decompression procedures for recreational diving: the DSAT recreational dive planner (Report). Tarrytown, NY: Diving Science & Technology Corp. Archived from the original on August 7, 2009.
- Lang, M.A.; Hamilton, R. W. Jr. (1989). Proceedings of the AAUS Dive Computer Workshop. United States: USC Catalina Marine Science Center.
- Hamilton Jr, RW. 1999. Round Table Discussion. In: Hamilton RW, Pence DF, Kesling DE, eds. Assessment and Feasibility of Technical Diving Operations for Scientific Exploration. Nahant, MA: American Academy of Underwater Sciences.
- R.W. Hamilton (et al.)Development and validation of no-stop decompression procedures for recreational diving : the DSAT recreational dive planner; with Richard Dunford, Merrill P. Spencer, Drew Richardson. Tarrytown, NY : Hamilton Research, c1994.
- Hamilton RW, Schreiner HR (eds). Development of Decompression Procedures for Depths in Excess of 400 feet. 9th Undersea and Hyperbaric Medical Society Workshop. UHMS Publication Number WS2-28-76. Bethesda: Undersea and Hyperbaric Medical Society; 1975; 272 pages.
- Neubauer RA, Gottlieb SF, Huan G, Hamilton RW. Letter: Neurologic Dysfunctions/ Coma, Equipment for Oxygen Delivery. J. Hyperbaric Med 1992; 7(1):57-61.
- Hamilton RW, Kizer KW (eds). Nitrogen Narcosis. 29th Undersea and Hyperbaric Medical Society Workshop. UHMS Publication Number 64WS(NN)4-26-85. Bethesda: Undersea and Hyperbaric Medical Society; 1985; various pages.
- Hamilton Jr, RW. 1999. Introduction to Technical Diving. In: Hamilton RW, Pence DF, Kesling DE, eds. Assessment and Feasibility of Technical Diving Operations for Scientific Exploration. Nahant, MA: American Academy of Underwater Sciences.
- Hamilton Jr, RW, In: Blogg, S.L., M.A. Lang, and A. Møllerløkken, editors. 2012. Proceedings of the Validation of Dive Computers Workshop. August 24, 2011, European Underwater and Baromedical Society Symposium, Gdansk. Trondheim: Norwegian University of Science and Technology.
- Hamilton Jr, RW; Factors Affecting Rebreather Performance. SPUMS 1997 Volume 27 Number 3.
- Hamilton Jr, RW; The scope of non-conventional recreational diving. SPUMS 1996 Volume 26 Number 3.
- Faesecka, K-P; Sterk, W; Hamilton, RW Jr.(eds). First International Arthur-Bornstein-Workshop on Medical Aspects of Deep Tunneling and Diving. 49th Undersea and Hyperbaric Medical Society Workshop. UHMS Publication Number . Bethesda: Undersea and Hyperbaric Medical Society; 2001; 135 pages.
- Freitag, M, Hamilton Jr, RW; Undersea Biomed Res. 1974 Jun;1(2):175-9.
- Schmidt TC, Dorr VA, Hamilton Jr RW. 1973. Chamber Fire Safety. Ocean Systems, Inc. UCRI-721
- Hamilton Jr, RW. The Warm Mineral Springs decompression plan and tables. In: Jaap, WC (ed). Advances in Underwater Science 90. Proceedings of the American Academy of Underwater Sciences Tenth annual scientific diving symposium. Held October 4–7, 1990 at the University of South Florida, St. Petersburg, Florida
- Hamilton RW, Kenyon DJ, Peterson RE. Repex habitat diving procedures: Repetitive vertical excursions, oxygen limits, and surfacing techniques. Technical Report 88-1B. Rockville, MD: NOAA Office of Undersea Research, May 1988.
- Hamilton RW, Schane W. 1990 October. Chisat I, extension and validation of NOAA's new Repex procedures for habitat diving: A Chinese-American collaboration. Research report 90-1. Silver Spring, MD: National Undersea Research Program.
- Lang, M.A. and R.W. Hamilton (eds.). 1989. Proceedings of the AAUS Dive Computer Workshop. USC Catalina Marine Science Center. 231 p.
- Hamilton Jr, RW. Shi, ZY. Schane, W. Chen, BS.. Lee, YC. Fan, ZH. Gu, ZZ, Zhang, LB; Chisat 1: A collaborative Chinese-American project in Nitrox saturation-excursion diving. Undersea Biomedical Research, Vol. 15, No. 1 Supplement, March 1989
- Butler, GL; Mastro, SJ; Hulbert, AW; Hamilton Jr, RW. Oxygen safety in the production of enriched air nitrox breathing mixtures. In: Cahoon, LB. (ed.) Proceedings of the American Academy of Underwater Sciences Twelfth Annual Scientific Diving Symposium "Diving for Science 1992". Held September 24–27, 1992 at the University of North Carolina at Wilmington, Wilmington, NC. American Academy of Underwater Sciences.
- Schneiner HR, Hamilton RW (eds). Validation of Decompression Tables. 37th Undersea and Hyperbaric Medical Society Workshop. UHMS Publication Number 74(VAL)1-1-88. Bethesda: Undersea and Hyperbaric Medical Society; 1989; 167 pages.
- Hamilton, RW Jr. (ed). Effectiveness of Dive Computers in Repetitive Diving. 44th Undersea and Hyperbaric Medical Society Workshop. UHMS Publication Number 81(DC)6-1-94. Bethesda: Undersea and Hyperbaric Medical Society; 1995; 71 pages
- Hamilton RW, Kenyon DJ, Peterson RE, Butler GJ, Beers DM. REPEX: Development of repetitive excursions, surfacing techniques, and oxygen procedures for habitat diving. Technical Report 88-1A. Rockville, MD: NOAA Office of Undersea Research, May 1988.
- Brubakk, AO. Tonjum, S Holand, B. Peterson, RE. Hamilton Jr, RW. Morild, E. Onarheim, J; Heat loss and tolerance time during cold exposure in heliox atmosphere at 16 ATA. Undersea Biomed Res. 1982 Jun;9(2):81-90.]
- Dituri, J. Parsley, K. Hamilton Jr, RW. Whelan, HT; Could the U.S. Navy benefit from technical diving techniques? Undersea Hyperb. Med. 2008 July-Aug;35(4)
- Hamilton Jr, RW. Powell, MR. Kenyon, DJ. Freitag, M. Neon Decompression, ONR Project NR-201-088, Contract N00014-74-C-0424
- Linnarsson, D. Ostlund, A. Sporrong, A. Lind, F. Hesser, CM. Hamilton Jr, RW; Does oxygen contribute to the narcotic action of hyperbaric air? Undersea Biomedical Research, Vol. 16, No. 1 Supplement, March 1990
- Hamilton Jr, RW. Cockrell, WA. Stanton, GR. Using the UHMS validation workshop guidelines to set up a Trimix diving program for archaeological research. Undersea Biomedical Research, Vol. 16, No. 1 Supplement, March 1990.
