= Decompression tables =

Tabulated data to facilitate safe diving ascents

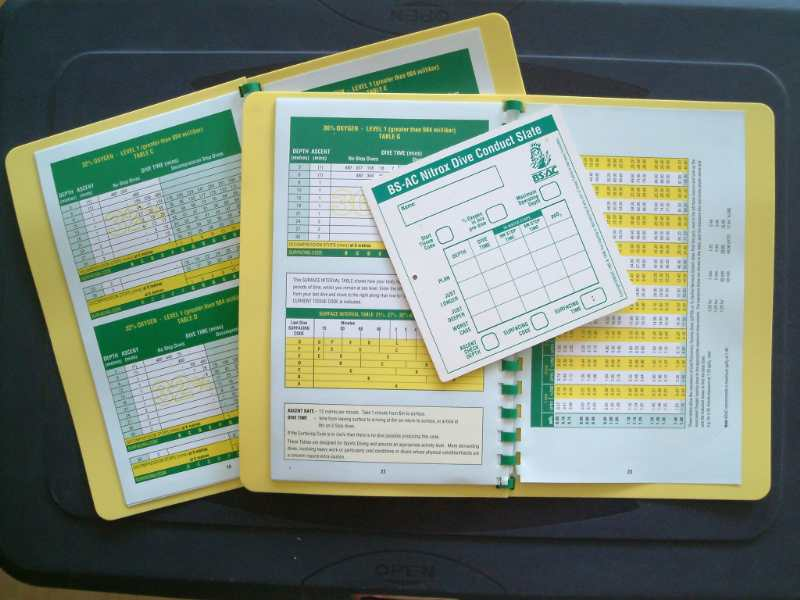
BSAC nitrox decompression tables

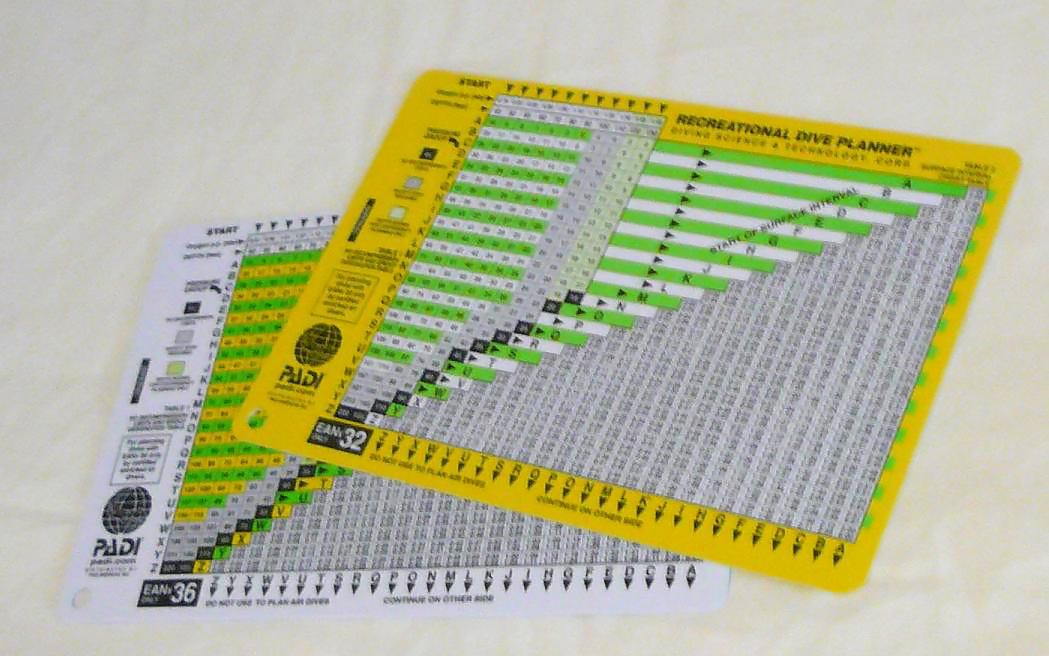
The PADI Nitrox tables are laid out in what has become a common format for no-stop recreational tables

Decompression tables, also known to divers as dive tables, are tabulated data, often in the form of printed cards or booklets, that allow people to determine a decompression schedule that is acceptably safe for a given dive or other hyperbaric exposure profile and breathing gas.

Decompression tables represent procedures recommended for decompression from hyperbaric exposures in a continuum of possibilities by schedules tabulated for discrete cases of such exposures chosen for practicality and convenience of the user. They may represent data from theoretical decompression models or empirical data from series of tests on human subjects, or combinations thereof, and may be empirically adjusted to reduce risk or improve decompression efficiency. The availability of dive computers which can apply algorithms in real time to calculate the personal decompression status of a diver have to a large extent supplanted decompression tables for recreational and scientific divers, but tables remain a practical and convenient method for deciding decompression schedules for people exposed to similar but not necessarily identical pressure profiles, particularly when they are to be decompressed as a group, such as saturation divers and compressed air workers.

With decompression tables, it is generally assumed that the hyperbaric exposure, or dive profile, is a square profile, meaning that the diver descends to maximum depth immediately and stays at the same depth until resurfacing (approximating a rectangular outline when drawn in a coordinate system where one axis is depth and the other is duration). Some dive tables also assume the physical condition or acceptance of a specific level of risk from the diver. Some recreational dive tables only provide for no-stop dives at sea level sites, but the more complete tables can take into account staged decompression dives and dives performed at altitude.

== Types of table ==
Tables have been produced for several modes of decompression, including surface oriented in-water and surface decompression profiles for air and mixed gases, with and without oxygen accelerated decompression, for constant oxygen fraction diving and for constant oxygen partial pressure diving, for repetitive dives, and for saturation diving. No-stop tables are also available for repetitive dives. Tables for nitrox diving with a single mixture and for altitude diving may be published as separate tables or as equivalent depths to be used with standard sea level air tables.

== Examples of decompression tables and procedures ==
=== 1% Risk tables ===
1% Risk tables are tables which satisfy the condition of a high probability (c0.95) of a low risk (c0.01) of producing symptomatic decompression sickness if followed according to the instructions. The condition may be stipulated for the no-stop limit, or may include profiles requiring staged decompression. Similar tables for other risk conditions like 5% risk tables have also been produced. Statistical analysis of a large number of actual relevant exposures is necessary for reliable results, and these may only be available for a subset of the desired range.

=== Bassett tables ===
The Bassett tables of 1985 reduced the no stop limits of the US Navy tables as recommended by Bruce Bassett and changed the rules for use. They also added decompression stops in case of accidentally exceeding the no-stop limits. The ascent rate was reduced to 10 msw (33 fsw) per minute, and a safety stop of 3 to 5 minutes at 3 to 5 msw (10 to 17 fsw) recommended for dives deeper than 9 msw (30 fsw), and Repetitive group was calculated using total dive time instead of bottom time.

=== Brazilian tables ===
For air diving and bounce diving on mixed gases, the Brazilian regulations authorise the use of US Navy tables.

==== Brazilian saturation procedures ====
The Brazilian saturation procedures are laid out in NORMAM-15/DPC Revision 2, of 2016. They specify continuous decompression without a rest stop from storage depth at a constant oxygen partial pressure of 500mbar until 20msw. The Brazilian procedures are strongly influenced by Comex experience and the North Sea standards.

Brazilian procedures for decompression from saturation recognise three depth ranges: Standard saturation refers to depths less or equal to 180 msw. Deep saturation refers to maximum depths between 180 and 300 msw. Exceptional saturation refers to maximum depth between 300 and 350 msw.

=== British Sub-Aqua Club tables ===
A version of the RNPL tables was used by the British Sub-Aqua Club (BS-AC) until the production of the BSAC'88 tables in 1988.

In 1968, the Royal Naval Physiological Laboratory (RNPL) at Alverstoke, England, produced a set of Air Diving Tables which were never put general use.These tables were developed by Hempleman and Hennessey and laid out similarly to the BS-AC '88 tables, but were considerably more conservative.

The early BS-AC tables only allowed two dives per day, in comparison with those based on Buhlmann and US Navy models. An interim third dive table was produced which limited depth to 9 msw, and the BS-AC'88 tables were developed as a longer term solution. The tables comprise four sets of seven tables, with each set intended for a different range of atmospheric pressures, more than 984 mb, 898 to 984 mb, 795 to 899 mb, and 701 to 795 mb, which are equivalent to ranges of altitudes.

Each table in a set is associated with a repetitive dive status. For the first dive, table "A" for the current ambient pressure is used. After a surface interval which determines the repetitive status, the table corresponding to that repetitive status is used.

The BS-AC decided to have a new set of tables developed to replace the RNPL/BS-AC Table, as the old table tended to be misunderstood and lacked suitable flexibility for recreational diving use. They wanted tables that would sufficiently versatile to function usefully in company with divers using personal dive computers.

The new table was designed by Tom Hennessy, who modified the RNPL model slightly to take into account multiple repetitive dives, up to four per day, and the RNPL model had not been tested for multiple repetitive dives, and was said to be marginal for long deep dives. The model also included the assumption of maximum depth for safe ascent with a saturated tissue of 7msw, that bubbles form after every decompression, and affect the subsequent gas intake on repetitive dives, in which tissues may saturate more rapidly.

The model assumes different rate of gas uptake during repetitive dives while the bubbles are redissolving, after which the uptake will be similar to on the initial dive of the series, so the model treats repetitive dives differently for predicting safe ascents. The tables were designed to get more conservative as the number of dives, depth and duration increase.

Unlike the US Navy model of the time, this model does not produce a residual nitrogen value based on a single tissue compartment. Seven tables are provided to account for different profiles. Table A assumes a fresh diver, clear of residual nitrogen. The diver surfaces with a tissue code based on the dive profile, which changes during the surface interval and indicates the table to be used for the next dive. Th dive times in the tables are from start of descent of start of decompression stop, including descent and initial ascent at the specified rates. There are no 3 m stops – the last stop is at 6 m, and the final ascent to surface is to take at least one minute.

The same procedure is used for further repetitive dives, and no calculations are required.

Comparison with other tables in use at the time (US Navy, Buhlmann, and DCIEM) show that the BS-AC '88 tables are more conservative than some and less than others, and this variation is in detail such as ascent rates and stop depths and times, as well as overall. There is also variation between repetitive dives planned on these tables. The BS-AC '88 tables were criticised as being less safe, untested, and based on an unpublished model.

=== Bühlmann decompression tables ===
The Bühlmann decompression model is a neo-Haldanian model which uses Haldane's or Schreiner's formula for inert gas uptake, a linear expression for tolerated inert gas pressure coupled with a simple parameterised expression for alveolar inert gas pressure and expressions for combining nitrogen and helium parameters to model the way inert gases enter and leave the human body as the ambient pressure and inspired gas changes. Different parameter sets are used to create decompression tables and in personal dive computers to compute no-decompression limits and decompression schedules for dives in real-time, allowing divers to plan the depth and duration for dives and the required decompression stops.

The model (Haldane, 1908) assumes perfusion limited gas exchange and multiple parallel tissue compartments and uses an exponential formula for in-gassing and out-gassing, both of which are assumed to occur in the dissolved phase. Bühlmann, however, assumes that safe dissolved inert gas levels are defined by a critical difference instead of a critical ratio.

Multiple sets of parameters were developed by Swiss physician Dr. Albert A. Bühlmann, who did research into decompression theory at the Laboratory of Hyperbaric Physiology at the University Hospital in Zürich, Switzerland. The results of Bühlmann's research that began in 1959 were published in a 1983 German book whose English translation was entitled Decompression-Decompression Sickness. The book was regarded as the most complete public reference on decompression calculations and was used soon after in dive computer algorithms.

In 1986 two sets of dive tables based on the Bühlmann model for recreational divers were published for altitude ranges from sea level to 700m above sea level, and for 701 m to 2500 m The repetitive group designators were based on the 80 minute tissue compartment.

=== DCIEM tables ===
In 1984 the DCIEM (Defence and Civil Institute of Environmental Medicine, Canada) released no-decompression and decompression tables based on Kidd/Stubbs serial four-compartment model. Each compartment had a half time of about 21 minutes, and allowable supersaturation ratios of 1.92 and 1.73 for the first two compartments. The last two compartments are not considered limiting during ascent. The tables were validated with extensive ultrasonic testing.

In 1990 the DCIEM sport diving tables were released. An unusual feature of these tables is the use of a repetitive multiplier, a factor read off a table for the surface interval, which is multiplied by the planned actual dive time of the repetitive dive to give the equivalent effective dive time.

=== French commercial diving tables ===
In 1973 the French civilian Tables du Ministère du Travail 1974 (MT74) were published. In 1992 the French civilian Tables du Ministère du Travail 1992 (MT92) were published, which include air tables and saturation procedures equivalent to those in the Comex 1986 diving manual. Two options were given for saturation decompression: For depths less than and equal to 155 msw, using 600 mbar oxygen partial pressure in the chamber, and for depths greater than 155 msw using 500 mbar chamber oxygen partial pressure. When the French diving regulations were revised in 2016, the saturation procedures remained unchanged.

=== French Navy MN90 tables ===
In 1965 the French Navy GERS (Groupe d'Etudes et Recherches Sous-marines) 1965 table was published. In 1990 the French Navy Marine Nationale 90 (MN90) decompression tables published.

The mathematical model used for the development of the MN 90 tables is Haldanian, and was also used for the GERS (Groupe d'Etudes et Recherches Sous-marines) 1965 table.

=== German tables ===
The German tables, also known as the Bühlmann/Hahn tables.

=== Huggins tables ===
The Huggins tables were a more conservative modification of the US Navy air table with tabular layout to make calculation of repetitive dives easier.

=== Jeppesen tables ===
The Jeppesen tables were a more conservative simple modification of the US Navy air tables intended for recreational diving in which the no-stop limit was reduced for each depth.

=== NAUI dive tables ===
The early National Association of Underwater Instructors (NAUI) dive tables were an adaptation of the US Navy dive tables of the time and tabular layout modifications to make calculation of repetitive dives easier. No-decompression limits were reduced by one repetitive group except for the 50 fsw limit which was reduced by two groups and the 40 fsw limit which was reduced by three groups. A safety stop of 3 minutes at 15 fsw was recommended. Dive times are based on total dive time excepting safety stop time, and a minimum surface interval of 1 hour recommended. No repetitive dives are allowed deeper than 100 fsw. Repetitive dives are defined as having a surface interval of less than 24 hours. NAUI also corrected some errors found on the Navy tables

NAUI published trimix and nitrox tables based on the Wienke reduced gradient bubble model (RGBM) in 1999, followed by recreational air tables based on the RGBM model in 2001.

=== NOAA Nitrox 1 and 2 tables ===
NOAA Nitrox I, also known as EAN32, a nitrox blend with 32% oxygen by volume, and NOAA Nitrox II, or EAN36, with 36% oxygen are two gas blends found sufficiently useful by NOAA to produce dive tables for the blends in which the equivalent air depths (EAD) for the gases were included directly in the tables, eliminating the need to use an air table for EAD. These tables were also used by recreational divers, but are now largely superseded by nitrox capable dive computers. NOAA nitrox tables are based on the US Navy air tables that were current when the NOAA tables were published, and they are laid out in a similar format.

=== Norwegian decompression tables ===
The Norwegian surface oriented diving tables were first published in 1980 in NUI report 30-80, and have remained much the same in later releases. They were released as a separate publication in 1986, as revisions in 1991 and 2004, with corrections in the May 2008 revision, and as the 4th edition in 2016. The air tables for in-water staged decompression were based on the Royal Navy Table 11, modified by requiring slower ascent and using a different procedure for repetitive dives. Profiles requiring more than 35 minutes decompression were provided, but considered excessive exposure, to be avoided where reasonably practicable.

The tables for surface decompression with oxygen are based on a modified version of the US Navy SUR-D O2 tables from 1951 and operational experience by Norwegian diving contractors. They are more conservative and have been found in practice to be safer than the originals. Oxygen is breathed in the chamber at pressures of 15 msw and 12 msw.

Norwegian standard air tables provide corrections for altitude dives up to 2000 m above sea level, using adjusted maximum depth and decompression stop depths with the standard decompression tables.

The Norwegian tables recognise "exceptional dives" as dives with a risk of DCS of over 6% or requiring more than 90 minutes of oxygen decompression in a chamber. It is recommended to not plan dives in this range, and repetitive dives following an exceptional dive are not permitted.

The use of nitrox is uncommon but acceptable for Norwegian commercial diving, and may be used with in-water or surface decompression. Maximum recommended oxygen partial pressure is 1.5 bar. A set of tables of equivalent air depth for some commonly used nitrox mixtures (32%, 36% and 40%) is provided, and these depths are used with the standard air tables.

A set of suggestions for increasing conservatism when circumstances suggest a greater than nominal risk of decompression sickness for a planned dive are provided.

==== Norwegian saturation decompression procedures ====
NORSOK standard U-100 Table 12 describes saturation decompression for commercial diving. NORSOK U-100 specifies the following restrictions on saturation decompression:

- Dive depth should be as close to storage depth as reasonably practicable
- Upward and downward excursions must be limited according to the standard
- Standard saturation is limited to depths of 180msw. For deeper dives the contractor must provide validated procedures.
- Storage depth may be changed, but once decompression has been started, no further compression is permitted (only V-profiles).
- An 8-hour hold is required after an excursion before decompression may be started. This is considered part of the decompression.
- Oxygen partial pressure shall be between 0.4 and 0.5 bar.
- A sleep period between midnight and 06.00 is required during which decompression is stopped.
- Saturation exposure is limited to 14 days.

=== PADI tables ===
Early PADI dive tables were based on the US Navy air tables with some modifications, and tabular layout modifications to make calculation of repetitive dives easier.

Raymond Rogers and DSAT started to analyse the applicability of the US Navy air table for recreational diving use in 1983. They found that the US Navy tables were less suited to the recreational demographic, and accepted a higher risk than appropriate for civilians with a broader range of physical fitness, and no support team or equipment on site. They also came to the conclusion that a 60 minute tissue would be more appropriate for short dive durations as the limiting tissue for residual nitrogen calculations when all dives were within the no-stop limits. It was also found that asymptomatic bubbles were common at and near the no-stop limit, so they also reduced it systematically.

The recreational dive planner (RDP) and "the wheel" are unusual formats for presenting a dive table.

==== Recreational Dive Planner ====
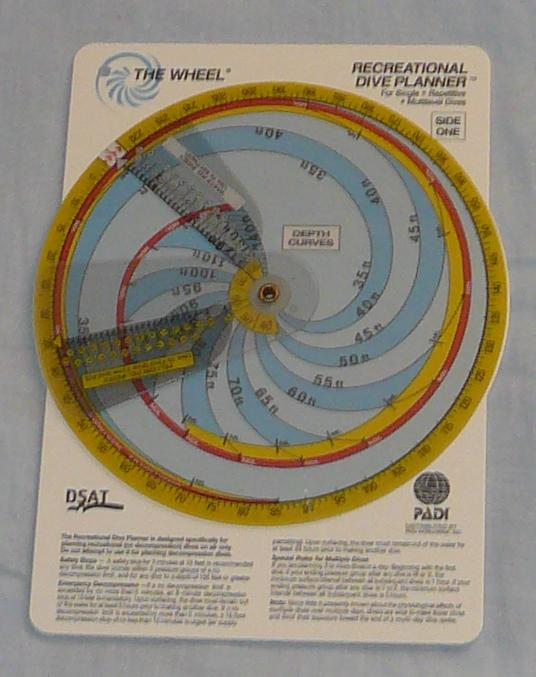
The PADI recreational dive planner, in "Wheel" format.

The Recreational Dive Planner (or RDP) is a set of devices marketed by PADI with which no-stop time underwater can be calculated. The RDP was developed by DSAT and was the first dive table developed exclusively for recreational, no stop diving. There are four types of RDPs: the original table version first introduced in 1988, The Wheel version, the original electronic version or eRDP introduced in 2005 and the latest electronic multi-level version or eRDPML introduced in 2008.

The low price and convenience of many modern dive computers mean that many recreational divers only use tables such as the RDP for a short time during training before moving on to use a diving computer.

=== Pandora tables ===
The Pandora tables were compiled for an expedition to a remote island in the South Pacific.

=== Royal Navy (RNPL) tables ===
Royal Naval Physiological Laboratory model

In the early 1950s, Hempleman developed a diffusion limited model for gas transfer from the capillaries into the tissues (Haldanian model is a perfusion model). The basis for this model is radial diffusion from a capillary into the surrounding tissue, but by assuming closely packed capillaries in a plane the model was developed into a "tissue slab" equivalent to one-dimensional linear bulk diffusion in two directions into the tissues from a central surface.

The 1972 RNPL tables were based on a modified Hempleman tissue slab model and are more conservative than the US Navy tables.

==== Blackpool decompression tables ====
The RNPL Air Diving Tables 1968, also known as CERIA tables and generally referred to as the Blackpool tables, are a set of tables for decompression from compressed air work on air from 12 pressure ranges from 1 to 3.45 bar, for exposure times up to 9.2 hours on a shift. Decompression stops are specified at pressure intervals of 0.2 bar, and decompression rates not exceeding 0.4 bar per minute between stops.

In 1960 Henry Valence Hempleman started work on decompression for compressed air workers, applicable to caisson and tunneling operations, and in 1966 published the Blackpool decompression tables, which became an internationally accepted industry standard for compressed air work.

The Blackpool tables have been used for compressed air work in the UK, Singapore, and Hong Kong for subway construction with around 0.91% DCS rate recorded over thousands of exposures. A version of the Blackpool tables has been produced incorporating oxygen decompression.

The Blackpool tables and RN air tables were compared with the US Navy air tables in a report published in 1980, and were found to be safer but less efficient than the US Navy air tables of the same period.

=== SWEN21 tables ===
SWEN21 is a proposed decompression table for use by the Swedish Navy, which was designed to have a 1% risk of decompression sickness at the no stop limits. A study using measurement of venous gas emboli (VGE) was used to evaluate risk. In the experimental series an actual DCS rate of 2% was observed.

The tables use the Thalmann EL-DCM algorithm with a new set of compartmental parameters called SWEN21B, which were derived by applying maximum likelihood analysis on a set of air dives with known DCS outcomes.

=== Tasmanial bounce diving tables ===
There was a high rate of decompression sickness in Tasmanian aquaculture divers after multiple repetitive, short-duration bounce dives in fish pens to depths up to 21 metres sea water (msw). These dives features surface intervals shorter than 15 minutes and were considered a single dive for decompression purposes. An empirical adjustment to the standard DCIEM no-stop times in use almost eliminated DCS, but were considered inefficient. An adapted procedure based on the DCIEM tables was drawn up for this application and field tested for bubble production using Doppler ultrasonic bubble detection. The new procedures were found to be acceptably safe and were endorsed for two series of bounce dives shallower than 21 msw per day.

=== US Navy Decompression Tables ===
Several iterations of US Navy air, nitrox and heliox decpmpression tables have been published, for both constant gas fraction (open circuit) and constant oxygen partial pressure (closed circuit).

The US Navy has used several decompression models from which their published decompression tables and authorized diving computer algorithms have been derived. The original C&R tables used a classic multiple independent parallel compartment model based on the work of John Scott Haldane in England in the early 20th century, using a critical ratio exponential ingassing and outgassing model. Later they were modified by O.D. Yarbrough and published in 1937. A version developed by M. Des Granges was published in 1956. Further developments by M.W. Goodman and Robert D. Workman using a critical supersaturation approach to incorporate M-values, and expressed as an algorithm suitable for programming were published in 1965, and later again a significantly different model, the VVAL 18 exponential/linear model was developed by Edward D. Thalmann, using an exponential ingassing model and a combined exponential and linear outgassing model, which was further developed by Gerth and Doolette and published in Revision 6 of the US Navy Diving Manual as the 2008 tables.

Besides the air and heliox tables for open circuit bounce dives, the US Navy has published a variety of hyperbaric treatment schedules, decompression tables for open and closed circuit heliox and nitrox, tables incorporating surface decompression on oxygen, a system for modifying tables for use at high altitudes (Cross altitude corrections), and saturation tables for various breathing gas mixtures. Many of these tables have been tested on human subjects, frequently with an endpoint of symptomatic decompression sickness, and for this reason their test results are considered some of the most reliable available.

US Navy tables have generally been freely available for use by the general public, and have often been modified to further reduce risk, as commercial and recreational divers do not always fit the physical requirements for military divers, may not have a recompression chamber on site to manage decompression sickness on those occasions when it does occur, and may prefer to operate at a lower risk than military personnel. Several recreational diving tables were originally based on US Navy diving tables.

==== US Navy Exceptional exposure tables ====
After the U.S. Navy 1956 tables were found to be problematic for dives deeper than 100 fsw for longer than 2 to 4 hours, the US Navy exceptional exposure tables were developed from an 8 compartment Haldanean model. They are not compatible with the rest of the US Navy Air tables for repetitive diving.

==== US Navy saturation tables ====
The first version of the US Navy saturation decompression procedures was published in the US Navy Diving Manual Revision 2 in 1976. They allowed decompression to start with an ascending excursion, and used a constant slow rate of decompression until 60 msw, after which varying rates were used to the surface. Chamber oxygen partial pressure of 350 to 400 mbar was used until the fire risk zone, after which the oxygen fraction was limited to between 19% and 23% for the final ascent. Decompression was suspended for a night rest stop from midnight to 06:00 and an afternoon stop from 14:00 to 16:00, leaving up to 16 hours per day for decompression.

US Navy Diving Manual Revision 7 of 2016 left the rates of decompression unchanged, but the oxygen partial pressure of the chamber atmosphere was increased to 440 to 480 mbar, and the timing of rest stops could be shifted to suit operational requirements.

== Comparison of schedules ==
Two criteria have been used in comparing decompression tables: Safety and efficiency, where decompression efficiency is defined as the ability of a schedule to provide safety from decompression sickness in the shortest time spent decompressing, and decompression safety is measured by the probability of decompression sickness incurred by following a given schedule for a given dive profile.

The large variations in human response to decompression profiles makes a 0% incidence of decompression sickness not realistically practicable. However, a decompression sickness incidence of 1% or less is possible, and may be considered sufficiently safe. When comparing two schedules of equivalent safety, the one which requires less decompression time is regarded as more efficient.

The traditional method of comparison uses symptomatic DCS as the criterion, but ultrasonic bubble counts have become a useful tool for comparison.

To illustrate the range of conclusions that the different models can come to, some figures are quoted from Huggins' 1992 "Dynamics of Decompression Workshop" document for no stop limits for a square profile dive to 100 fsw:

- US Navy air tables (1965) 25 minutes
- NAUI 22 minutes
- PADI, BSAC, Jeppesen, Huggins 20 minutes
- German Tables 18 minutes
- DCIEM Tables 17 minutes
- Maximum Likelihood 1% Risk Tables 8 minutes

== Alternatives to decompression tables ==
=== Dive computers ===
A dive computer, personal decompression computer or decompression meter is a device used by an underwater diver to measure the elapsed time and depth during a dive and use this data to calculate and display an ascent profile which, according to the programmed decompression algorithm, will give a low risk of decompression sickness. A secondary function is to record the dive profile, warn the diver when certain events occur, and provide useful information about the environment. Dive computers are a development from decompression tables, the diver's watch and depth gauge, with greater accuracy and the ability to monitor dive profile data in real time.

=== Decompression software ===
Decompression software is code that runs on a computer to calculate a decompression schedule for a dive profile input by the user. There are several mobile apps and other which run on desktop operating systems. Several algorithms are available, sometimes as choices on the same app. The difference between these apps and the software running on personal decompression computers is that these require profile and gas input from the user, and do not run real time simulations. Decompression software is generally used to produce a set of tables for a specified dive profile when the dive can be realistically planned to follow the profile, and usually a few contingency schedules to allow for plausible deviations from the plan.

== See also ==
- Dive computer – Instrument to calculate decompression status in real time
- Decompression equipment – Equipment used by divers to facilitate decompression
- Decompression practice – Techniques and procedures for safe decompression of divers
- Decompression sickness – Disorder caused by dissolved gases forming bubbles in tissues
- Decompression theory – Theoretical modelling of decompression physiology
- History of decompression research and development
- Hyperbaric treatment schedules – Planned hyperbaric exposure using a specified breathing gas as medical treatment
- Physiology of decompression – Physiological basis for decompression theory and practice
- Underwater habitat – Human habitable underwater enclosure filled with breathable gas
- Work in compressed air – Occupational activity in an atmosphere with a raised ambient pressure
