= Work in compressed air =

Occupational activity in an atmosphere with a raised ambient pressure

Work in compressed air, compressed air work or hyperbaric work is occupational activity in an enclosed atmosphere at a controlled ambient pressure significantly higher than the adjacent normal atmospheric pressure. There are many parallels with underwater diving, and a few significant differences.

== Applications ==
Compressed air work is mostly used in civil engineering projects where a raised ambient pressure is used to counteract ingress of groundwater from the surrounding soil or rock by balancing the hydrostatic pressure of the water with an applied air pressure inside an enclosed and sealed working area, such as a caisson, shaft, or tunnel.

== Classes ==
Traditionally, compressed air work was generally limited to gauge pressures of about 3–4 bar (ambient pressures of approximately 4–5 bar absolute), but experience with offshore saturation diving shows that higher pressures can be managed at acceptable risk using the techniques developed in that industry, including saturation exposures and the use of breathing gases other than air.

Compressed air work may be categorised as "low pressure", where staged decompression is not required regardless of exposure time gauge pressure below approximately 0.7 bar (jurisdiction-dependent), "intermediate pressures" requiring stage decompression, but below the statutory limit, and "high pressure" where the ambient pressure is above the statutory limit gauge pressure above 3.5 bar in the UK (limits vary by jurisdiction).

Work at 5.5 bar was necessary during tunnelling operations under Hong Kong, after the tunnel boring machine was damaged after hitting hard pink granite near the shore. The cutting heads seized, and part of the top of the tunnel collapsed, flooding the tunnel with seawater. The relatively hot environment made the usual procedure of freezing the surrounding rock with liquid nitrogen impracticable, so it was decided to pressurise the tunnel and work at ambient pressure until repairs could be completed. New decompression tables were developed and validated because the 1966 Blackpool tables had been associated with an unacceptably high incidence of dysbaric osteonecrosis during tunnelling operations previously used for tunnelling work had produced significant long-term osteonecrosis injuries. Much of the work and decompression was done using trimix breathing gases.

== Physiology of hyperbaric exposure ==
The major physiological differences between compressed air work and underwater diving are associated with the air environment in compressed air work and the water immersion of diving operations. This reduces risk as drowning is unlikely, other environmental hazards of hypothermia and hyperthermia are more easily managed, and the worker is not encumbered by a diving suit and helmet, though other personal protective equipment appropriate to the worksite is usually necessary, and the risk of fire may be higher. There is also often a significant difference in the numbers of personnel exposed in the hyperbaric working area. In diving it is seldom more than three, while in compressed air work there may be more.

=== Decompression ===
Decompression at the end of a shift is usually done in an airlock between the hyperbaric working area and the outside environment, and may routinely use pure oxygen as a breathing gas to accelerate decompression. Decompression schedules have been developed specifically for compressed air work, but other schedules of acceptable safety record may be used.

=== Saturation hyperbaric work ===
When the pressure of the workplace is relatively high, decompression at the end of a shift can take an uneconomically long time and exposes the worker to daily risk. In these cases it may be both economically preferable and reduce the overall risk to the workers to resort to saturation exposures, in which the workers remain under pressure for a tour of duty which may be for several days or weeks, and are decompressed conservatively just once at the end. In this scenario hyperbaric living quarters and the staff to operate them are needed, but full shifts can be worked. Transportation under pressure in a hyperbaric shuttle vehicle will usually be necessary to transfer workers between the accommodation and the workplace.

== Health and safety ==
Compressed air work is generally considered a potentially hazardous occupational environment, and may be regulated accordingly. In some jurisdictions legislation may be specific to compressed air work, while in others it may be combined with diving regulations.

=== Medical aspects ===
Legislation may require medical screening for candidate compressed air workers, similar to that for diving, and medical surveillance may be required for compressed air workers during and after exposure. Short-term health risks include decompression sickness, barotraumas of compression and decompression, and long term risks include dysbaric osteonecrosis.

=== Management of decompression sickness ===
The risk of decompression sickness cannot be eliminated within reasonably practicable procedures, and the contractor is generally obliged to provide emergency recompression facilities on site so that any cases or suspected cases of decompression sickness can be expeditiously treated.

== History ==
- Jacques Triger
- Eads Bridge
- Brooklyn Bridge

== See also ==
- Airlock – Compartment for transfer between environments with different atmospheres
- Caisson (engineering) – Rigid structure to provide workers with a dry working environment below water level
- Decompression sickness – Disorder caused by dissolved gases forming bubbles in tissues
- Decompression theory – Theoretical modelling of decompression physiology
- Sandhog – Term for underground construction workers in New York City
- Tunnel boring machine – Device used to excavate tunnels
