= Alf O. Brubakk =

Norwegian decompression researcher (1941–2022)

Alf Ottar Brubakk (24 January 1941 – 5 April 2022) was a Norwegian researcher and professor at the Faculty of Medicine and Health Sciences Department of Circulation and Imaging (ISB) of the Norwegian University of Science and Technology (Norwegian: Norges teknisk-naturvitenskapelige universitet) in Trondheim, Norway. He worked in the physiology of underwater diving, particularly decompression, was an advisor on diving physiology to the offshore diving industry, and a president of the European Underwater and Baromedical Society.

== Early life and education ==
Brubakk originally wanted to be a marine biologist, but decided that he was more likely to get an interesting job if he studied medicine, which he did at Giessen in Germany, and after graduating, did his internship at a small island in West Norway.

He was approached by the head of the health service in Trondheim who offered him a research position financed by the county. He collaborated with Rune Aaslid from 1970 on a mathematical model of the cardiovascular system intended to be used clinically to obtain data that could not be measured directly in the patient. This work led to development of pulsed Doppler ultrasound equipment, for collecting data on the circulatory system, and which showed that blood flow velocity could be used to evaluate internal pressure in the heart non-invasively.

== Career ==
Brubakk started his professional life in cardiology and then practiced for several years as an anesthesiologist, before being offered a job as Assistant Professor of Applied Physiology in Trondheim. Later he shifted to environmental physiology and diving medicine, and was professor of environmental physiology at the Norwegian University of Science and Technology in Trondheim. He researched decompression sickness (DCS) for more than 20 years and also studied other areas of environmental physiology, including the effects of cold and outer space.

The offshore oil exploration and production off Norway was in its early days and commercial diving became an important industry for Bergen, where the Norwegian Underwater Institute (Norwegian Underwater Intervention?) was established to do diving research. Brubakk joined the NUI, where experimental dives were done to about 500 m. He started some ultrasonic studies, as bubbles are a good reflector, though the thinking at the time was that bubbles were present but not important. Brubakk thought they would have some pathophysiological relevance. The first study showed significant vascular bubble presence in both venous and arterial circulation, but this was not considered when the next US Navy decompression tables were drawn up, as at the time, the US Navy tested the calculated profiles against an endpoint of symptomatic DCS. Studies of bubble formation and distribution during and after decompression have continued, and it remains a field of research as of 2022.

Brubakk was medical advisor to a major commercial diving company for over 35 years until 2015, was responsible for advice in diving procedures for Subsea 7, and was involved in diver training.

Brubakk was a long-time member and former president (2006-2009), of the European Underwater and Baromedical Society (EUBS).

== Publications ==
Scientific papers:

- Eftedal, O.; Mohammadi, Ramin; Rouhani, Majid; Brubakk, Alf O. (1995). "Computer real time detection of intravascular bubbles". European Underwater and Baromedical Society on Diving and Hyperbaric Medicine.
- Brubakk, Alf O. (2015). "Oxygen and the brain; The journey of our life time". Diving and Hyperbaric Medicine. 45 (4): 266. ISSN 1833-3516.
- Hansen, Kasper; Hansen, Esben S.S.; Lars P., Tolbod; Kristensen, Martin C.; Ringgaard, Steffen; Brubakk, Alf O. (2015). "ACT-, PET- and MR-imaging-compatible hyperbaric pressure chamber for baromedical research". Diving and Hyperbaric Medicine. 45 (4): 247–254. ISSN 1833-3516. PMID 26687313.
- de Quiros, Yara Bernaldo; Møllerløkken, Andreas; Bjordal Havnes, Marianne; Brubakk, Alf O.; Gonzalez-Diaz, Oscar; Fernandez, Antonio (2016). "Bubbles Quantified In vivo by Ultrasound Relates to Amount of Gas Detected Post-mortem in Rabbits Decompressed from High Pressure". Frontiers in Physiology. 7: 310. doi:10.3389/fphys.2016.00310. ISSN 1664-042X. PMC 4954815. PMID 27493634.
- de Quirós, Yara Bernaldo; Saavedra, Pedro; Møllerløkken, Andreas; Brubakk, Alf O.; Jørgensen, Arve; González-Díaz, Oscar (2016). "Differentiation at necropsy between in vivo gas embolism and putrefaction using a gas score". Research in Veterinary Science. 106: 48–55. doi:10.1016/j.rvsc.2016.03.007. ISSN 0034-5288. PMID 27234535.
- Brubakk, Alf O.; Ross, J.A.S.; Thom, Stephen R. (2014). "Saturation diving; Physiology and pathophysiology". Comprehensive Physiology. 4 (3): 1229–1272. doi:10.1002/cphy.c130048. ISSN 2040-4603. PMID 24944036.
- Glavas, Duska; Brubakk, Alf O; Obad, Ante; Bakovic, Darija; Møllerløkken, Andreas; Eftedal, Olav Sande (2010). "High bubble grades after scuba diving at the limits of recreational diving algorithm". European Heart Journal. 31: 677. ISSN 0195-668X.
- de Quirós, Yara Bernaldo; Saavedra, Pedro; Møllerløkken, Andreas; Brubakk, Alf O.; Jørgensen, Arve; González-Díaz, Oscar (2016). "Differentiation at necropsy between in vivo gas embolism and putrefaction using a gas score". Research in Veterinary Science. 106: 48–55. doi:10.1016/j.rvsc.2016.03.007. ISSN 0034-5288. PMID 27234535.
- Blogg, Lesley S; Gennser, Mikael; Møllerløkken, Andreas; Brubakk, Alf O. (2014). "Ultrasound detection of vascular decompression bubbles: The influence of new technology and considerations on bubble load". Diving and Hyperbaric Medicine. 44 (1): 35–44. ISSN 1833-3516. PMID 24687484.
- Jørgensen, Arve; Foster, Philip P; Brubakk, Alf O.; Eftedal, Ingrid (2013). "Effects of hyperbaric oxygen preconditioning on cardiac stress markers after simulated diving". Physiological Reports. 1 (6): e00169. doi:10.1002/phy2.169. ISSN 2051-817X. PMC 3871481. PMID 24400168.
- Eftedal, Ingrid; Ljubkovic, Marko; Flatberg, Arnar; Jørgensen, Arve; Brubakk, Alf O.; Dujic, Zeljko (2013). "Acute and potentially persistent effects of scuba diving on the blood transcriptome of experienced divers". Physiological Genomics. 45 (20): 965–972. doi:10.1152/physiolgenomics.00164.2012. hdl:11250/2466798. ISSN 1094-8341. PMID 23964024.
- Eftedal, Ingrid; Jørgensen, Arve; Ljubkovic, Marko; Flatberg, Arnar; Røsbjørgen, Ragnhild; Brubakk, Alf O. (23–28 September 2013). Applying genomics tools in studies of barophysiology. Tricontinental meeting on diving and hyperbaric medicine. Ile de la Reunion: European Underwater and Baromedical Society.
- Blatteau, Jean-Eric; Brubakk, Alf O.; Gempp, Emmanuel; Castagna, Olivier; Risso, Jean-Jacques; Vallée, Nicolas (2013). "Sidenafil Pre-Treatment Promotes Decompression Sickness in Rats". PLOS ONE. 8 (4) e60639. Bibcode:2013PLoSO...860639B. doi:10.1371/journal.pone.0060639. ISSN 1932-6203. PMC 3620342. PMID 23580342.
- de Quiros, Y.B.; Gonzalez-Diaz, O.; Møllerløkken, Andreas; Brubakk, Alf O.; Hjelde, Astrid; Saavedra, P. (2013). "Differentiation at autopsy between in vivo gas embolism and putrefaction using gas composition analysis". International Journal of Legal Medicine. 127 (2): 437–445. doi:10.1007/s00414-012-0783-6. ISSN 0937-9827. PMID 23090361. S2CID 24105262.
- Havnes, Marianne Bjordal; Widerøe, Marius; Thuen, Marte; Torp, Sverre Helge; Brubakk, Alf O.; Møllerløkken, Andreas (2013). "Simulated dive in rats lead to acute changes in cerebral blood flow on MRI, but no cerebral injuries to grey or white matter". European Journal of Applied Physiology. 113 (6): 1405–1414. doi:10.1007/s00421-012-2565-8. ISSN 1439-6319. PMC 3654193. PMID 23232710.
- Eftedal, Ingrid; Jørgensen, Arve; Røsbjørgen, Ragnhild; Flatberg, Arnar; Brubakk, Alf O. (2012). "Early genetic responses in rat vascular tissue after simulated diving". Physiological Genomics. 44 (24): 1201–1207. doi:10.1152/physiolgenomics.00073.2012. ISSN 1094-8341. PMID 23132759.

Books:

- Brubakk, Alf; Neuman, Tom, eds. (14 Jan 2003). Bennett and Elliotts' Physiology and Medicine of Diving (5th ed.). Saunders Ltd. ISBN 978-0-7020-2571-6.
- Lang, Michael A.; Brubakk, Alf O., eds. (1 January 2009). The Future of Diving: 100 Years of Haldane and Beyond. Smithsonian Institution Scholarly Press. ISBN 978-0-9788460-5-3.
