= Decompression illness =

Disorders arising from ambient pressure reduction

Decompression Illness (DCI) comprises two different conditions caused by rapid decompression of the body. These conditions present similar symptoms and require the same initial first aid. Scuba divers are trained to ascend slowly from depth to avoid DCI. Although the incidence is relatively rare, the consequences can be serious and potentially fatal, especially if untreated.

== Classification ==
DCI can be caused by two different mechanisms, which result in overlapping sets of symptoms. The two mechanisms are:

- Decompression sickness (DCS), which results from metabolically inert gas dissolved in body tissue under pressure emerging out of solution and forming bubbles during decompression. It typically afflicts underwater divers on poorly managed ascent from depth or aviators flying in inadequately pressurised aircraft.
- Arterial gas embolism (AGE), which is perfusion blockage caused by gas bubbles in the arterial bloodstream. In the context of DCI these may form either as a result of bubble nucleation and growth by dissolved gas into the blood on depressurisation, which is a subset of DCS above, and leakage from venous circulation to arterial circulation via patent foramen ovale or other shunt, or by gas entering the blood mechanically as a result of pulmonary barotrauma. Pulmonary barotrauma is a rupturing of lung tissue by expansion of breathing gas held in the lungs during depressurisation. This may typically be caused by an underwater diver ascending while holding the breath after breathing at ambient pressure, ambient pressure escape from a submerged submarine without adequate exhalation during the ascent, or the explosive decompression of an aircraft cabin or other pressurised environment. Other forms of lung overpressure injury such as pneumothorax require distinctly different treatment to AGE.

In any situation that could cause decompression sickness, there is also potentially a risk of arterial gas embolism, and as many of the symptoms are common to both conditions, it may be difficult to distinguish between the two in the field, and first aid treatment is the same for both mechanisms.

== Signs and symptoms ==
Approximately 90 percent of patients with DCS develop symptoms within three hours of surfacing; only a small percentage become symptomatic more than 24 hours after diving.

Below is a summary comparison of the signs and symptoms of DCI arising from its two components: Decompression Sickness and Arterial Gas Embolism. Many signs and symptoms are common to both maladies, and it may be difficult to diagnose the actual problem. The dive history can be useful to distinguish which is more probable, but it is possible for both components to manifest at the same time following some dive profiles.

Decompression sickness	Arterial Gas Embolism
Signs
Skin rash; Paralysis, muscle weakness; Difficulty in urinating; Confusion, personality changes, bizarre behaviour; Loss of memory, tremors; Staggering; Collapse or unconsciousness	Bloody froth from mouth or nose; Paralysis or weakness; Convulsions; Unconsciousness; No breathing; Death
Symptoms
Fatigue; Skin itch; Pain in joints or muscles; Dizziness, vertigo, ringing in the ears; Numbness, tingling and paralysis; Shortness of breath	Dizziness; Blurring of vision; Areas of decreased sensation; Chest pain; Disorientation

== Causes ==
Decompression sickness is caused by the formation and growth of inert gas bubbles in the tissues when a diver decompresses faster than the gas can be safely disposed of through respiration and perfusion.

Arterial gas embolism is caused by gas in the lungs getting into the pulmonary venous circulation through injuries to the capillaries of the alveoli caused by lung overpressure injury. These bubbles are then circulated to the tissues via the systemic arterial circulation, and may cause blockages directly or indirectly by initiating clotting.

== Mechanism ==
The mechanism of decompression sickness is different from that of arterial gas embolism, but they share the causative factor of depressurization.

=== Decompression sickness ===
Depressurisation causes inert gases, which were dissolved under higher pressure, to come out of physical solution and form gas bubbles within the body. These bubbles produce the symptoms of decompression sickness. Bubbles may form whenever the body experiences a reduction in pressure, but not all bubbles result in DCS. The amount of gas dissolved in a liquid is described by Henry's Law, which indicates that when the pressure of a gas in contact with a liquid is decreased, the amount of that gas dissolved in the liquid will also decrease proportionately.

On ascent from a dive, inert gas comes out of solution in a process called "outgassing" or "offgassing". Under normal conditions, most offgassing occurs by gas exchange in the lungs. If inert gas comes out of solution too quickly to allow outgassing in the lungs then bubbles may form in the blood or within the solid tissues of the body. The formation of bubbles in the skin or joints results in milder symptoms, while large numbers of bubbles in the venous blood can cause lung damage. The most severe types of DCS interrupt — and ultimately damage — spinal cord function, leading to paralysis, sensory dysfunction, or death. In the presence of a right-to-left shunt of the heart, such as a patent foramen ovale, venous bubbles may enter the arterial system, resulting in an arterial gas embolism. A similar effect, known as ebullism, may occur during explosive decompression, when water vapour forms bubbles in body fluids due to a dramatic reduction in environmental pressure.

=== Arterial gas embolism ===
When a diver holds their breath during an ascent the reduction in pressure will cause the gas to expand and the lungs will also have to expand to continue to contain the gas. If the expansion exceeds the normal capacity of the lungs, they will continue to expand elastically until the tissues reach their tensile strength limit, after which any increase in pressure difference between the gas in the lungs and the ambient pressure will cause the weaker tissues to rupture, releasing gas from the lungs into any permeable space exposed by the damaged tissue. This could be the pleural space between the lung and the chest walls, between the pleural membranes, and this condition is known as pneumothorax. The gas could also enter the interstitial spaces within the lungs, the neck and larynx, and the mediastinal space around the heart, causing interstititial or mediastinal emphysema, or it could enter the blood vessels of the venous pulmonary circulation via damaged alveolar capillaries, and from there reach the left side of the heart, from which they will be discharged into the systemic circulation. On the way out through the aorta the gas may be entrained in blood flowing into the carotid or basilar arteries. If these bubbles cause blockage in blood vessels, this is arterial gas embolism. Vascular obstruction and inflammation caused by gas bubbles causes end organ damage to most tissues. Sufficient pressure difference and expansion to cause this injury can occur from depths as shallow as 1.2 metres (3.9 ft).

== Diagnosis ==
Definitive diagnosis is difficult, as most of the signs and symptoms are common to several conditions and there are no specific tests for DCI. The dive history is important, if reliable, and the sequence and presentation of symptoms can differentiate between possibilities. Most doctors do not have the training and experience to reliably diagnose DCI, so it is preferable to consult a diving medicine specialist, as misdiagnosis can have inconvenient, expensive and possibly life-threatening consequences. Prior to 2000, there was a tendency to under-diagnose DCI, and as a result a number of cases did not get the treatment that could have produced a better result, while since 2000, there has been a swing to over-diagnosis, with consequent expensive and inconvenient treatments, and expensive inconvenient and risky evacuations that were not necessary. The presence of symptoms of pneumothorax, mediastinal or interstitial emphysema would support a diagnosis of arterial gas embolism if symptoms of that condition are also present, but AGE can occur without symptoms of other lung overpressure injuries. Most cases of arterial gas embolism will present symptoms soon after surfacing, but this also happens with cerebral decompression sickness.

Numbness and tingling are associated with spinal DCS, but can also be caused by pressure on nerves (compression neurapraxia). In DCS the numbness or tingling is generally confined to one or a series of dermatomes, while pressure on a nerve tends to produce characteristic areas of numbness associated with the specific nerve on only one side of the body distal to the pressure point. A loss of strength or function is likely to be a medical emergency. A loss of feeling that lasts more than a minute or two indicates a need for immediate medical attention. It is only partial sensory changes, or paraesthesias, where this distinction between trivial and more serious injuries applies.

Large areas of numbness with associated weakness or paralysis, especially if a whole limb is affected, are indicative of probable brain involvement and require urgent medical attention. Paraesthesias or weakness involving a dermatome indicate probable spinal cord or spinal nerve root involvement. Although it is possible that this may have other causes, such as an injured intervertebral disk, these symptoms indicate an urgent need for medical assessment. In combination with weakness, paralysis or loss of bowel or bladder control, they indicate a medical emergency.

== Prevention ==
Almost all arterial gas embolism is avoidable by not diving with lung conditions which increase the risk and not holding the breath during ascent. These conditions will usually be detected in the diving medical examination required for professional divers. Recreational divers are not all screened at this level. Complete emptying of the lungs is not recommended in emergency swimming ascents as this is thought to increase the risk by collapsing small air passages and trapping air in parts of the lung. Rate of ascent is not usually an issue for AGE.

Decompression sickness is usually avoidable by following the requirements of decompression tables or algorithms regarding ascent rates and stop times for the specific dive profile, but these do not guarantee safety, and in some cases, unpredictably, there will be decompression sickness. Decompressing for longer can reduce the risk by an unknown amount. Decompression is a calculated risk where some of the variables are not well defined, and it is not possible to define the point at which all residual risk disappears. Risk is also reduced by reducing exposure to ingassing and taking into account the various known and suspected risk factors. Most, but not all, cases are easily avoided.

== Treatment ==
Treatment for the Decompression Sickness and the Arterial Gas Embolism components of DCI may differ significantly, but that depends mostly on the symptoms, as both conditions are generally treated based on the symptoms. Refer to the separate treatments under those articles.

Urgency of treatment depends on the symptoms. Mild symptoms will usually resolve without treatment, though appropriate treatment may accelerate recovery considerably. Failure to treat severe cases can have fatal or long term effects. Some types of injuries are more likely to have long lasting effects depending on the organs involved.

=== First aid ===
First aid is common for both DCS and AGE:

- Monitor the patient for responsiveness, airway, breathing and circulation, resuscitate if necessary.
- Treat for shock.
- Lay the patient on their back, or for drowsy, unconscious, or nauseated victims, on their side.
- Administer 100% oxygen as soon as possible.
- Seek immediate medical assistance, locate a hospital with hyperbaric facilities and plan for possible transport.
- Allow the patient to drink water or isotonic fluids only if responsive, stable, and not suffering from nausea or stomach pain. Administration of intravenous saline solution is preferable.
- Record details of recent dives and responses to first aid treatment and provide to the treating medical specialist. The diving details should include depth and time profiles, breathing gases used and surface intervals.

== Prognosis ==
The prognosis of the DCS is generally favorable for patients with mild symptoms, given timely and appropriate treatment, and in excellent health before the dive. Symptoms may resolve within days after prompt administration of high-flow oxygen and rest.

The outcome for cerebral arterial gas embolism largely depends on severity and the delay before recompression. Most cases which are recompressed within two hours do well. Recompression within six hours often produces improvement and sometimes full resolution. Delays to recompression of more than 6 to 8 hours are not often very effective, and are generally associated with delays in diagnosis and delays in transfer to a hyperbaric chamber.

Xu et al. reported a 99.3% effectiveness rate of treating decompression illness with immediate recompression in a study of 5,278 cases across 2000–2010 in China. The initial symptom occurred within 6 hours after surfacing in 98.9% of cases.

Long term complications can arise as end organ damage from air embolisms. In bones, dysbaric osteonecrosis leads to pathological fractures and chronic arthritis, particularly in the proximal femur, humerus, and tibia. In the brain and spinal cord, depending on the area and severity of damage there can be neurological deficits ranging from becoming comatose, having sensorimotor weakness, incontinence, and other effects. The lungs can develop pulmonary fibrosis. The pancreas, kidneys, and liver are also vulnerable, and regional necrosis in the gastrointestinal tract can cause strictures leading to obstruction.

== Epidemiology ==
Roughly 3 to 7 cases per 10,000 dives are diagnosed, of which about 1 in 100,000 dives are fatal.
