= Dysbaric osteonecrosis =

Ischemic bone disease caused by decompression bubbles

- Specialty: Diving medicine, occupational medicine

Dysbaric osteonecrosis or DON is a form of avascular necrosis where there is death of a portion of the bone that is thought to be caused by nitrogen (N_{2}) embolism (blockage of the blood vessels by a bubble of nitrogen coming out of solution) in divers. Although the definitive pathologic process is poorly understood, there are several hypotheses:

- Intra- or extravascular nitrogen in bones, "nitrogen embolism".
- Osmotic gas effects due to intramedullary pressure effects.
- fat embolism
- hemoconcentration and increased coagulability.

== Cause ==
Dysbaric osteonecrosis is associated with exposure to large ambient pressure changes, but the underlying etiology remains uncertain. Dysbaric osteonecrosis is radiologally indistinguishable from similar lesions not associated with pressure changes.

The prevalent hypothesis is that gas bubbles which block the flow of blood are the cause, but there is not always symptomatic decompression sickness recorded in bones where dysbaric osteonecrosis later occurs. It is therefore considered possible that there may be other factors increasing the effects of gas bubbles on the affected bone. It has been suggested that rapid compression may impede intramedullary venous drainage and increase the risk of DO.

== Presentation ==
The lesion begins as a localised area of infarction, usually without symptoms. Early identification of lesions by radiography is not possible, but over time areas of radiographic opacity develop in association with the damaged bone. Symptomatic lesions usually involve joint surfaces, and fracture where attempted healing occurs. This process takes place over months to years and eventually causes disabling arthritis, particularly of the femoral head (hip).

Dysbaric osteonecrosis lesions are typically bilateral and usually occur at both ends of the femur and at the proximal end of the humerus. Symptoms are usually only present when a joint surface is involved, which typically does not occur until a long time after the causative exposure to a hyperbaric environment. The initial damage is attributed to the formation of bubbles, and one episode can be sufficient, however incidence is sporadic and generally associated with relatively long periods of hyperbaric exposure, and aetiology is uncertain.

== Diagnosis ==
The diagnosis is made by x-ray/MRI appearance and has five juxta-articular classifications and forehead, neck, and shaft classifications indicating early radiological signs.

Early on there is flattening of articular surfaces, thinning of cartilage with osteophyte (spur) formation. In juxta-articular lesions without symptoms, there is dead bone and marrow separated from living bone by a line of dense collagen. Microscopic cysts form, fill with necrotic material and there is massive necrosis with replacement by cancellous bone with collapse of the lesions.

The following staging system is sometimes useful when managing lesions.

- Stage 0 - Intravascular coagulation
- Stage 1 - Dead bone without repair
- Stage 2 - Dead bone with repair but without collapse
- Stage 3 - Dead bone with repair and with collapse
- Stage 4 - Secondary degenerative arthritis

In a study of bone lesions in 281 compressed air workers done by Walder in 1969, 29% of the lesions were in the humeral head (shoulder), 16% in the femoral head (hip), 40% in the lower end of the femur (lower thigh at the knee) and 15% in the upper tibia (knee below the knee cap).

It is possible that the condition can worsen even after the initial diagnostic x-ray shows no symptoms, given continued exposure to decompression.

== Prevention ==
Prevention is a more successful strategy than treatment. By using the most conservative decompression schedule reasonably practicable, and by minimizing the number of major decompression exposures, the risk of DON may be reduced. Prompt treatment of any symptoms of decompression sickness (DCS) with recompression and hyperbaric oxygen also reduce the risk of subsequent DON.

== Treatment ==
Treatment is difficult, often requiring a joint replacement. Spontaneous improvement occasionally happens and some juxta-articular lesions do not progress to collapse. Other treatments include immobilization and osteotomy of the femur. Cancellous bone grafts are of little help.

== Prognosis ==
If the diver has not been exposed to excessive depth and decompression and presents as DON, there may be a predisposition for the condition. Diving should be restricted to shallow depths. Divers who have suffered from DON are at increased risk of future fracture of a juxta-articular lesion during a dive, and may face complications with future joint replacements. Because of the young age of the population normally affected, little data is available regarding joint replacement complications.

There is the potential for worsening of DON for any diving where there might be a need for decompression, experimental or helium diving. Physically stressful diving should probably be restricted, both in sport diving and work diving due to the possibility of unnecessary stress to the joint. Any diving should be less than 40 feet/12 meters. These risks are affected by the degree of disability and by the type of lesion (juxta-articular or shaft).

== Prevalence ==
Dysbaric osteonecrosis is a significant occupational hazard, occurring in 50% of commercial Japanese divers, 65% of Hawaiian diving fishermen and 16% of commercial and caisson divers in the UK. Its relationship to compressed air is strong in that it may follow a single exposure to compressed air, may occur with no history of DCS but is usually associated with significant compressed air exposure. The distribution of lesions differs with the type of exposure - the juxta-articular lesions being more common in caisson workers than in divers. There is a definite relationship between length of time exposed to extreme depths and the percentage of divers with bone lesions. Evidence does not suggest that dysbaric osteonecrosis is a significant risk in recreational scuba diving.
