= Ambient pressure =

Pressure of the surrounding medium

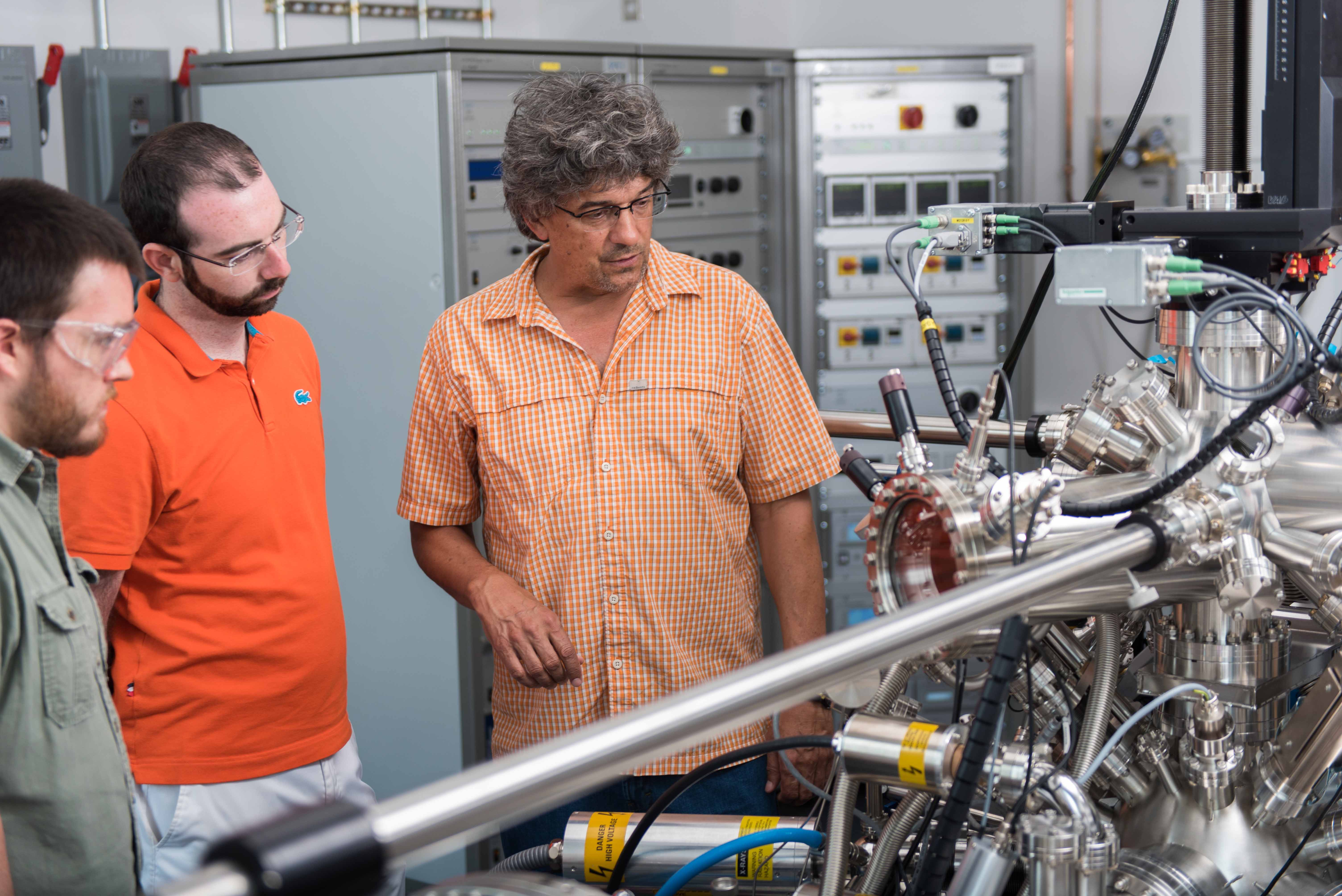
A laboratory studying ambient pressure at Oregon State University

The ambient pressure on an object is the pressure of the surrounding medium, such as a gas or liquid, in contact with the object.

== Atmosphere ==
Within the atmosphere, the ambient pressure decreases as elevation increases. By measuring ambient atmospheric pressure, a pilot may determine altitude (see pitot-static system). Near sea level, a change in ambient pressure of 1 millibar is taken to represent a change in height of 9 metres (30 ft).

== Underwater ==
The ambient pressure in water with a free surface is a combination of the hydrostatic pressure due to the weight of the water column and the atmospheric pressure on the free surface. This increases approximately linearly with depth. Since water is much denser than air, much greater changes in ambient pressure can be experienced under water. Each 10 metres (33 ft) of depth adds another bar to the ambient pressure.

Ambient-pressure diving is underwater diving exposed to the water pressure at depth, rather than in a pressure-excluding atmospheric diving suit or a submersible.

== Other environments ==
The concept is not limited to environments frequented by people. Almost any place in the universe will have an ambient pressure, from the hard vacuum of deep space to the interior of an exploding supernova. At extremely small scales the concept of pressure becomes irrelevant, and it is undefined at a gravitational singularity.

== Units of pressure ==
The SI unit of pressure is the pascal (Pa), which is a very small unit relative to atmospheric pressure on Earth, so kilopascals (kPa) are more commonly used in this context. The ambient atmospheric pressure at sea level is not constant: it varies with the weather, but averages around 100 kPa. In fields such as meteorology and underwater diving, it is common to see ambient pressure expressed in bar or millibar. One bar is 100 kPa or approximately ambient pressure at sea level. Ambient pressure may in other circumstances be measured in pounds per square inch (psi) or in standard atmospheres (atm). The ambient pressure at sea level is approximately one atmosphere, which is equal to 1.01325 bars (14.6959 psi), which is close enough for bar and atm to be used interchangeably in many applications. In underwater diving the industry convention is to measure ambient pressure in terms of water column. The metric unit is the metre sea water which is defined as 1/10 bar.

=== Examples of ambient pressure in various environments ===
Pressures are given in terms of the normal ambient pressure experienced by humans – standard atmospheric pressure at sea level on earth.

Environment	Typical ambient pressure in standard atmospheres
Hard vacuum of outer space	0 atm
Surface of Mars, average	0.006 atm
Top of Mount Everest – 8,849 m (29,032 ft)	0.333 atm
Pressurized passenger aircraft cabin altitude 8,000 ft (2,400 m)	0.76 atm
Sea level atmospheric pressure	1 atm
Surface of Titan	1.45 atm
10 m depth in seawater	2 atm
20 m depth in seawater	3 atm
Recreational diving depth limit (40 m)	5 atm
Common technical diving depth limit (100 m)	11 atm
Experimental ambient pressure dive maximum (Maximum ambient pressure a human has survived)	54 atm
Surface of Venus	92 atm
1 km depth in seawater	101 atm
Deepest point in the Earth's oceans	1100 atm
Centre of the Earth	3.3 to 3.6 million atm
Centre of Jupiter	30 to 45 million atm
Centre of the sun	244 billion atm
