= Jeffrey Bozanic =

American technical and scientific diver

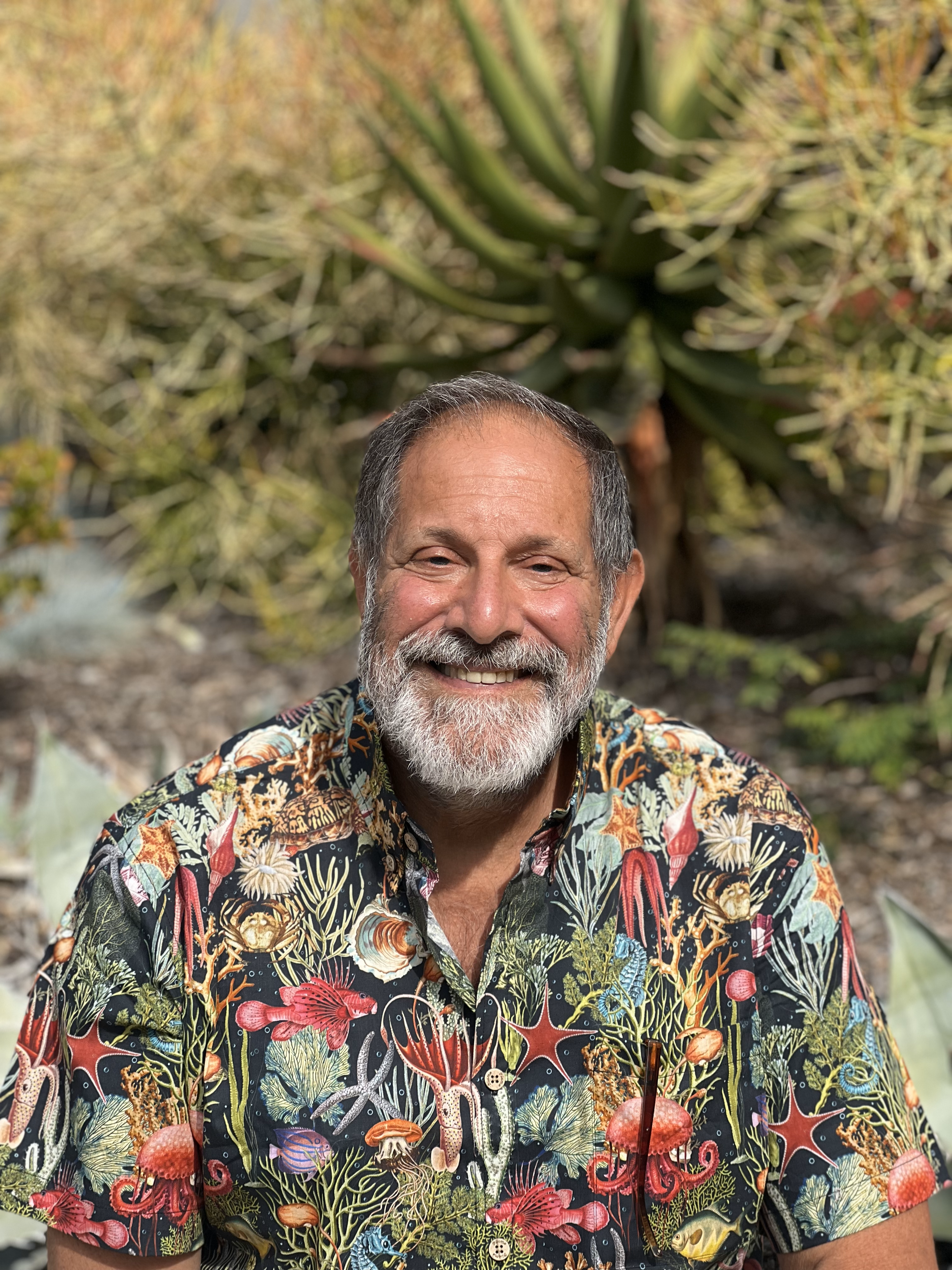
- Jeffrey Bozanic (2025)
- Born: Jeffrey Evan Bozanic; October 25, 1957 (age 68)
- Education: University of California, Irvine; Santa Ana College (AA,1978); Humboldt State University (BS,1979) (MA,1980); University of California, Los Angeles (MBA,1982); University of Miami; Madison University (PhD, 2003)
- Occupations: Scientific diver and instructor
- Writing career
- Notable work: Mastering Rebreathers
- Website: jeffbozanic.com

Jeffrey Evan Bozanic (born October 25, 1957) is an American technical and scientific diver, author, inventor, and scientist who is known for his contributions to diving and underwater research and exploration.

== Early life ==
Inspired by Voyage to the Bottom of the Sea, Bozanic began learning scuba at age 15 in lieu of taking traditional high school physical education classes. After a two-year hiatus, Bozanic was re-certified by his physics teacher, John Wozny, through NAUI. He continued his interest in diving through college and completed his instructor candidate course at the age of 20, and when he turned 21 was able to begin dive instruction. Throughout his youth, Bozanic was active with the Boy Scouts of America and achieved the distinction of Eagle Scout in 1972. He remains active as a volunteer with the Boy Scouts of America.

== Education ==
Bozanic attended the University of California, Irvine from 1974 to 1977 and in 1978 received an Associate of Arts degree from Santa Ana College in Underwater Technology. In 1979, he obtained a Bachelor of Science in Geology, and the following year a Master of Arts in Environmental Education, both from Humboldt State University. In 1982, he received a Master of Business Administration in International Studies from the University of California, Los Angeles. From 1982 to 1984, he attended the University of Miami and conducted doctoral studies in oceanography. In 2003, Bozanic obtained his Doctor of Philosophy in Education from Madison University.

== Career ==
Since 1984, Bozanic has been the president of Next Generation Services (NGS). NGS provides consulting services as well as dive training and research. NGS also provides business consulting, including expansion assistance and financial modeling. He also held positions with Carbon Company Inc. as a Chief Financial Officer from 1996 to 1998, management consultant for Aquarius Research International, Inc. (1980-1989) and Dive Locker Technician for Antarctic Support Associates, Inc. (1991-1992) and Antarctic Services, Inc (1998-1990).

Bozanic was a diver for several research expeditions to Antarctica, including 2018's "Under a Cracked Sky" which won first prize for The New York Times. digital storytelling contest.

== Scientific discoveries ==
Bozanic has discovered the following species:

- Agostocaris bozanici Kensley, 1988
- Bahadzia bozanici Holsinger, 1992
- Hacelia bozanici Hendler, 1996

== Patents ==
- U.S. Patent 8,196,581 B2, June 12, 2012: Mouthpiece supply valve: With LE Frimann, M Tessum, F Gauthier
- U.S. Patent 8,733,344 B2, May 27, 2014: Mouthpiece supply valve control system: With F Gauthier
- U.S. Patent US-20200001956-A1 January 2, 2020: Automated Recreational Closed Circuit Breathing Device: With F Gauthier

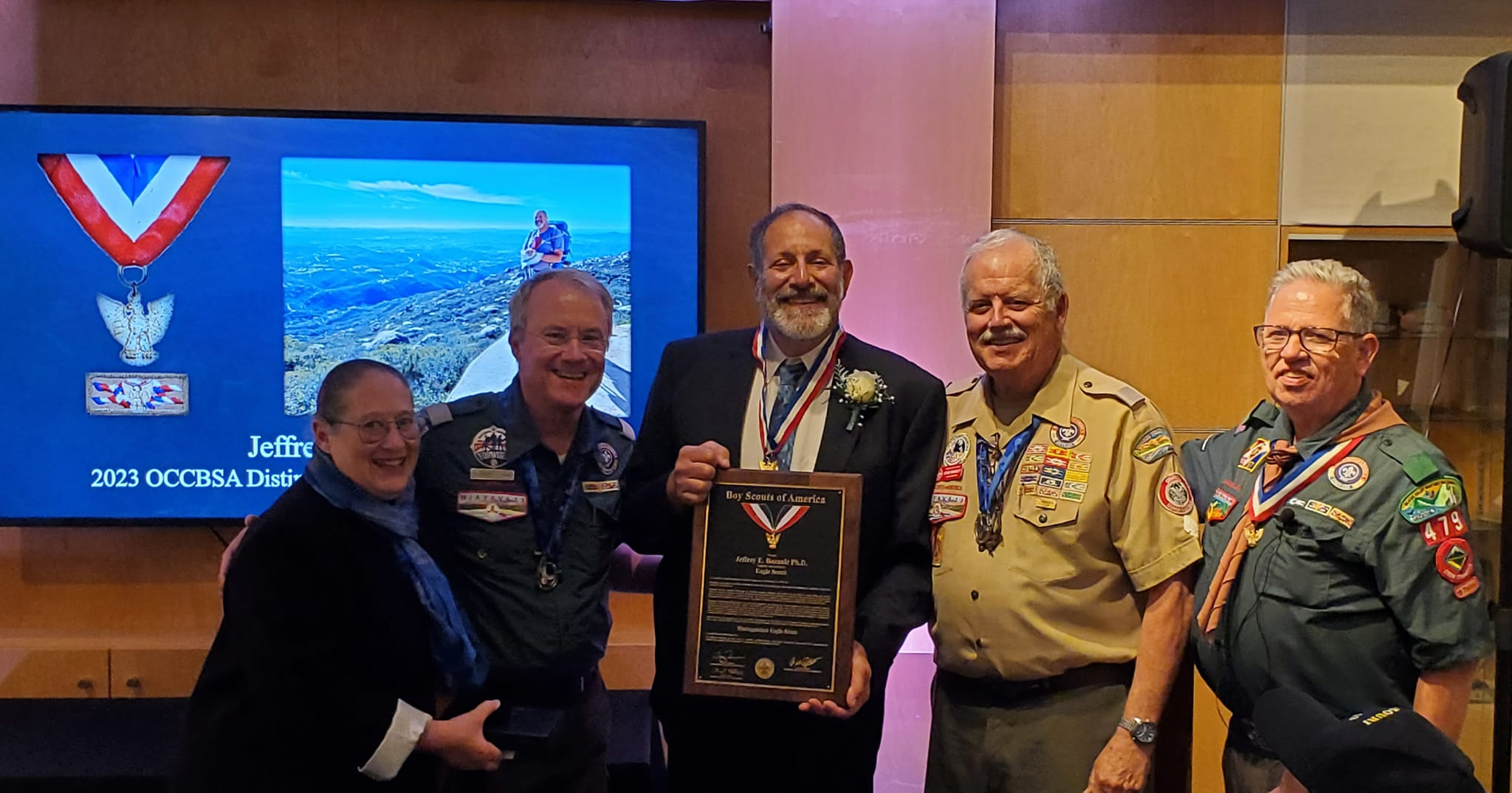
Jeff Bozanic receiving DESA

== Awards and honors ==
Sponsor	Award	Year
BSA	Eagle Scout	1972
NAUI	Outstanding Service Award	1984
NSSCDS	Abe Davis Award	1984
NAUI	Continuing Service Award	1986
NAUI	Continuing Service Award	1996
SSI	Platinum Pro 5000 Diving Award	1998
NAUI	NAUI Hall Of Honor Award	2002
NSSCDS	Sheck Exley Award	2005
NSS	Fellow of the Society	2005
DAN	Rolex Diver of the Year	2007
NAUI	Lifetime Achievement Award	2014
AAUS	Conrad Limbaugh Award for Scientific Diving Leadership	2015
BSA	Distinguished Eagle Scout Award	2023
AUAS	New Orleans Grand Isle (NOGI) Award	2024

== Publications ==
Bozanic is the author of 2002's Mastering Rebreathers by Best Publishing of Flagstaff Arizona and revised again for the second edition in 2010. He was a member of the editing team for the 6th edition of the NOAA Diving Manual which was released in 2017 also with Best Publishing.

He is also a frequent author of online diving articles including:

International Underwater Cave Rescue Recovery

- Compilation of Technical Diving Incident Database
- Technical Diving: Too Far Too Soon?
- Recent Trends in Cave Diving Fatalities
- “Ideal” Manifolds… Not So Ideal?
- Manifold Options for Cave Diving

Scuba Diving International/Technical Diving International

- My Favorite Dive
- Neutral Buoyancy—Let’s Get Real!
- Continuing Education
- Into the Abyss
- Scuba Poker: A Navigational Training Exercise
- Rebreathers—Are They for Me?
- A Day in the Life of a Research Diver
- Ten Diving Fantasies

Bozanic is also referenced in:

- Brueggeman, Peter (April 2023). Diving Under Antarctic Ice: a History, 1902-1964 (PDF) (Report).
- Robbins, Rob; Rupp, Steven (July 2017). Antarctic Dive Guide ASC-17-022 (PDF) (Report).

== Personal life ==
Jeff is married to his wife Rebekah and has three children.
