= Archaeological diving =

Method in underwater archaeology

Archaeological diving is a type of scientific diving used as a method of survey and excavation in underwater archaeology. The first known use of the method comes from 1446, when Leon Battista Alberti explored and attempted to lift the ships of Emperor Caligula in Lake Nemi, Italy. Just a few decades later, in 1535, the same site saw the first use of a sophisticated breathing apparatus for archaeological purposes, when Guglielmo de Lorena and Frances de Marchi used an early diving bell to explore and retrieve material from the lake, although they decided to keep the blueprint of the exact mechanism secret. The following three centuries saw the gradual extension of diving time through the use of bells and submersing barrels filled with air. In the 19th century, the standard copper helmet diving gear was developed, allowing divers to stay underwater for extended periods through a constant air supply pumped down from the surface through a hose. Nevertheless, the widespread utilisation of diving gear for archaeological purposes had to wait until the 20th century, when archaeologists began to appreciate the wealth of material that could be found under the water. This century also saw further advances in technology, most important being the invention of the aqualung by Émile Gagnan and Jacques-Yves Cousteau, the latter of whom would go on to use the technology for underwater excavation by 1948. Modern archaeologists use two kinds of equipment to provide breathing gas underwater: self-contained underwater breathing apparatus (SCUBA), which allows for greater mobility but limits the time the diver can spend in the water, and Surface-supplied diving equipment (SSDE or SSBA), which is safer but more expensive, and can only be used in shallower waters.

== Applications ==
Diving is a method that has uses for all stages of underwater excavation. Even with recent technological advances, diver searches remain of central importance for the location of sites. This can simply mean the diver swimming around and noting objects of interest of the seafloor, but it is usually supplemented through the use of a wide array of tools, such as hand-held metal detectors, lines to guide the search and make it more systematic. Alternatively, the diver may be towed by vessel on the surface or use an underwater vehicle, which preserves the diver's stamina and gives them greater speed, but can decrease accuracy. Once a site is located, divers continue to play an important role in surveying it. At this stage, diving is necessary to take the most basic of measurements and apply methods of surveying similar to those used on land, including trilateration, grid division and photography. These methods often require special training or equipment usually not necessary on land to be used for underwater archaeology. Most of the actual excavation is also done by diving, and again uses the same tools, but often requires different considerations. For example, trowels, brushes and other tools are used to move the soil, but the diver's movements might also disturb the sediment, which can lead to inadvertent damage of the site, but which can also be utilised to delicately expose artifacts.

== Comparison with archeological methods on land ==
Compared with methods of land survey and excavations, archaeological diving has distinct advantages and disadvantages. The equipment, such as air compressors, exposure suits, compressed air cylinders, masks and fins, together with the training required for proper scientific diving is considerably more expansive than the training and equipment usually used during land excavations, contributing to underwater archaeology generally requiring greater funding. Time is also in more limited supply for divers, as it is determined by the available supply of air and the physical and physiological stress placed on them by spending prolonged periods of time underwater. Perhaps the greatest risk is posed by decompression sickness (DCS), caused by excessive concentrations of nitrogen from the breathing air dissolved in the diver's tissues, and which can be painful, debilitating and in some cases, fatal. Managing the decompression safely requires one of three methods: the use of dive tables or personal dive computers that stipulate the amount of time the diver can spend at a specified depth, staged decompression, (stops at shallower depths during the ascent) to allow the safe release of nitrogen from the body, or using a decompression chamber at the surface. Consequently, archaeologists may be limited to diving for only around 40 minutes each day, depending on the depth of the site. Further difficulties include heat loss due to the water temperature, nitrogen narcosis, a physiological effect of increased nitrogen levels on the central nervous system, and low or distorted visibility. Despite these difficulties, working in the water can have distinct advantages over land archaeology, resulting from both the environment and the nature of the finds themselves. Diving allows for vertical movement in the water, which lets the excavator view the site from different angles without having to disturb it. The removal and transportation of sediment is usually easier underwater, as it can be carried away by simple suction devices or even just the currents themselves. The moving of heavy objects is also easier in many cases, as they can be simply buoyed up to the surface using lift bags filled with air. The nature of the underwater material can also help the diver when they collect data. The majority of underwater sites, such as shipwrecks, are single-component meaning there is no contamination from earlier or later periods. Additionally, many objects might be better preserved underwater than on the land.

== Examples ==
=== Antikythera wreck ===
In 1900, Greek sponge divers discovered numerous statues under the water near the island of Antikythera, deposited as a result of the sinking of a ship from the first century BCE. These statues were then raised under the direction of Director of Antiquities George Byzantinos. This initial excavation is a good example of the possibilities and early shortcomings of underwater archaeology and archaeological diving. The material recovered is of exceptional quality, but one diver died and two others were paralyzed by decompression sickness, while the seabed was not mapped and the excavation was not systematic. Another, more detailed investigation of the site took place 1976, directed by Jacques-Yves Cousteau and supervised by the Greek archaeologist L. Kolonas. After the shipwreck was relocated, detailed photographs of it were taken. Due to the depth at which the wreck is located, divers could only work at the bottom for a maximum of six minutes at a time, and they used decompression techniques before surfacing. They used a kind of airlift called the seceuse to recover the objects, which included statuettes, jewellery and other cargo from the ship.

=== Uluburun shipwreck ===
The Uluburun shipwreck was discovered in 1982 by a sponge diver off the south-western coast of Turkey. It was excavated by the Institute of Nautical Archaeology over the following years. It has been dated to the late 14th century BCE, and the material retrieved, including large amounts of copper and tin, ceramics, precious metals, tools, weapons and other objects, reveal much about the long-distance trade and manufacturing practices of the time. Archaeological diving took centre stage in both the initial exploration and the subsequent excavation of the site, with 22,413 dives accounting for 6,613 hours spent at the seabed. This means that most dives took only around 20 minutes, which can in part be explained by great depth at which they were conducted, between 41 and 61 meters.

=== Lighthouse of Alexandria ===
The famous Lighthouse of Alexandria in Egypt, considered one of the Seven Wonder of the Ancient World, was built during the Ptolemaic Period and was destroyed by a series of earthquakes in the medieval period. Early investigations of the site were conducted by the amateur underwater archaeologist Kamel Abul-Saadat in 1961 and then by a UNESCO mission led by Honor Frost. Following damage to the remains of the lighthouse by the construction of a concrete wall to defend a nearby medieval fortress, a Franco-Egyptian team under the leadership of Jean-Yves Empereur conducted salvage inspection and excavation of the site from 1994 to 1998. The mission included on average around 30 divers. They carefully mapped and recorded the site, and lifted multiple objects of note from the water. These included statues and pillars from earlier periods of pharaonic history, showing how these were relocated to the new capital by the Ptolemies. The site is an excellent example of how underwater archaeology can be used beyond shipwrecks.

=== Page–Ladson site ===
The Page–Ladson site is a sinkhole in the bed of the Aucilla River in Florida. Pre-Clovis and early Archaic artifacts have been recovered from stratified deposits at the bottom of the sinkhole 10 meters below the surface of the river. The pre-Clovis artifacts were associated with the bones of mastodons and other Pleistocene animals, with some bones showing apparent butchering marks. The site was discovered by amateur scuba divers in 1959. Systematic excavation of the site was carried out from 1983 until 1997, and again from 2012 until 2014. Equipment used to support excavations included surface air supplies for divers, underwater communications devices, waterproof housings for cameras, and a floating dredge to lift sediment to the surface for screening.

== See also ==
- Archaeological site – Place in which evidence of past activity is preserved
- Marine salvage – Recovering a ship or cargo after a maritime casualty
- Scientific diving – Use of diving techniques in the pursuit of scientific knowledge
- Underwater archaeology – Study of human activity via evidence found underwater
- Wreck diving – Recreational diving on wrecks
- Blue Heritage Project - Turkish initiative focusing on archaeological discoveries within its coastal waters.
