= Zafer İlken =

Turkish educator

- Born: 1960 (age 65–66); Ankara
- Occupation: Rector of İYTE
- Website: iyte.edu.tr/~zaferilken

Zafer İlken is a Turkish educator, university administrator and the author/co-author of numerous scientific papers, who had served (since 2006) as the third rector of the İzmir Institute of Technology, founded in 1992.

== Education ==
Zafer İlken received his degrees in mechanical engineering from the Middle East Technical University (B.Sc., 1982) in Ankara and Dokuz Eylül University (M.Sc., 1987 and Ph.D., 1990) in İzmir.

== Selected publications ==
Among his research writings, which have been published in a number of scientific journals, have been:

- Bilir, Levent & İlken, Zafer (December 2007). "Erratum to 'Total solidification time of a liquid phase change material enclosed in cylindrical/spherical containers'". Applied Thermal Engineering. 27 (17–18): 2929. doi:10.1016/j.applthermaleng.2005.04.025. hdl:11147/2045.
- Erek, Aytunç; Özerdem, Barış; Bilir, Levent & İlken, Zafer (October 2005). "Effect of geometrical parameters on heat transfer and pressure drop characteristics of plate fin and tube heat exchangers". Applied Thermal Engineering. 25 (14–15): 2421–2431. Bibcode:2005AppTE..25.2421E. doi:10.1016/j.applthermaleng.2004.12.019. hdl:11147/1966.
- Bilir, Levent & İlken, Zafer (July 2005). "Total solidification time of a liquid phase change material enclosed in cylindrical/spherical containers". Applied Thermal Engineering. 25 (10): 1488–1502. Bibcode:2005AppTE..25.1488B. doi:10.1016/j.applthermaleng.2004.10.005. hdl:11147/2013.
- Başaran, Tahsin & İlken, Zafer (February 1998). "Thermal analysis of the heating system of the Small Bath in ancient Phaselis". Energy and Buildings. 27 (1): 1–11. Bibcode:1998EneBu..27....1B. doi:10.1016/S0378-7788(97)00013-3.
- Erek, Aytunç & İlken, Zafer (February 1998). "Correlations for planar solidification of some phase change materials". International Communications in Heat and Mass Transfer. 25 (2): 245–250. Bibcode:1998ICHMT..25..245E. doi:10.1016/S0735-1933(98)00011-6.
- İlken, Zafer & Gunerhan, Huseyin (October 1996). "An investigation about the relations between the results of heat conduction problems with and without phase change". International Communications in Heat and Mass Transfer. 23 (6): 889–905. Bibcode:1996ICHMT..23..899I. doi:10.1016/0735-1933(96)00072-3.
- İlken, Zafer & Erek, Aytunç (September–October 1996). "A correlation for planar solidification of water". International Communications in Heat and Mass Transfer. 23 (5): 679–685. Bibcode:1996ICHMT..23..679I. doi:10.1016/0735-1933(96)00050-4.
- Toksoy, Macit & İlken, Zafer (1991). "The effects of phase change during the stand-by period in latent heat energy storage systems". Solar Energy. 47 (2): 69–73. Bibcode:1991SoEn...47...69T. doi:10.1016/0038-092X(91)90036-V.
