= Mustafa Gültepe =

Turkish businesspeople (born 1968)

President of Türkiye Exporters Assembly
- Incumbent
- Assumed office 13 June 2022

Personal details
- Born: 1968 (age 57–58) Tonya, Trabzon
- Children: 3
- Education: Dokuz Eylul University; Istanbul University
- Profession: Businessman, Industrialist

Mustafa Gültepe (born 1968 in Tonya, Trabzon) is the current President of Türkiye Exporters Assembly (TİM), former chairman of the board of directors of Istanbul Ready-to-Wear and Apparel Exporters' Association (İHKİB) (in Turkish: İstanbul Hazır Giyim ve Konfeksiyon İhracatçıları Birliği ), and Vice President of the Board of Directors of the Turkish Foreign Economic Relations Board (DEİK).

== Career ==
Gültepe graduated from Dokuz Eylul University Industrial Engineering Department in 1990 and obtained his master's degree from Istanbul University in 1997.

He joined the textile industry in 1992 with Taha Tekstil and became a founding partner and the chairman of the board of Talu Tekstil AŞ, which was established in 1994 as a subordinate of Taha Group.

Throughout his professional journey, Gültepe has assumed significant responsibilities within sectoral institutions and organizations.

Gültepe joined the management board of İHKİB in 2006 and served as the Vice Chairman of the Board between 2014 and 2018 and became the Chairman of İHKİB in the elections held in April 2018.

He was elected as the chairman of the board of directors at the 29th Ordinary General Assembly of the Türkiye Exporters Assembly (TİM) held on 13 June 2022, winning all valid 273 votes of the 274 votes cast, an event attended by President Erdogan.

He also served as the Chairman of the Board of the Sakarya Organized Industrial Zone between 2017 and 2021.

In the İHKİB elections held in April 2026, Gültepe handed over the chairmanship to Mustafa Paşahan. In addition to serving as the President of TİM, he also holds positions as Vice Chairman of the Board at DEİK, Board Member at Türk Eximbank, Vice Chairman of the Board at İGE AŞ, Deputy Chairman of Türk Ticaret Bankası, and Member of the Executive Committee at KOSGEB.

He is married with three children and is fluent in English.
