= Evina Katsou =

Environmental engineer

- Education: University of Athens
- Scientific career
- Workplaces: Imperial College London; Brunel University of London
- Thesis: Wastewater Treatment with the Use of Membranes (2008)

Evina Katsou is a Greek environmental engineer who is chair in Water Engineering at Imperial College London. She developed advanced computational tools, artificial intelligence, machine learning and data-driven models for sustainable and resilient solutions in water and wastewater.

== Early life and education ==
Katsou studied chemical engineering at the University of Athens. She remained in Athens for her graduate studies, where she completed her a master's degree in science and water resources. Her doctorate developed membranes for wastewater treatment. She was a postdoctoral researcher at the University of Verona.

== Research and career ==
Katsou develops new technologies for wastewater treatment. Amongst these technologies, Katsou he has developed and investigated membrane bioreactors, sequencing batch reactors and upflow anaerobic sludge blankets. She has worked on new strategies to extract cellulose and opportunities for zero-waste (zero defect) manufacture of photonic components. Katsou moved to Brunel University, where she applied tools from data analysis and artificial intelligence to wastewater management. She joined Imperial College London in 2024.

She is also interested in biological nutrient removal from effluents (liquid waste) through nitration. Every year, the UK produces around 1.4m tonnes of sewage sludge. The majority of sewage sludge is used as manure for farming. Katsou has demonstrated that the nutrient values can vary dramatically between sewage treatment plants, which makes it difficult to sell to farmers, and that it is a poor fertiliser because of how many contaminants there are in the food chain. She has explored options for the remaining sludge; from giving it away for free to incineration. She has argued that valuable components can be extracted from sludge; from phosphorus, to calcium carbonate, to cellulose, which could potentially make wastewater treatment plants powerful producers of reusable components.

She leads national and international programmes in carbon foot-printing, combing life cycle analysis, cost-benefit analysis and ecosystem services. This includes developing a methodology that promotes the circular use of wastewater, reducing the carbon footprint of certain wastewater management processes by two thirds and eutrophication by two fifths.

== Selected publications ==
- J. Malinauskaite; H. Jouhara; D. Czajczyńska; P. Stanchev; E. Katsou; P. Rostkowski; R.J. Thorne; J. Colón; S. Ponsá; F. Al-Mansour; L. Anguilano; R. Krzyżyńska; I.C. López; A.Vlasopoulos; N. Spencer (December 2017). "Municipal solid waste management and waste-to-energy in the context of a circular economy and energy recycling in Europe". Energy. 141: 2013–2044. Bibcode:2017Ene...141.2013M. doi:10.1016/j.energy.2017.11.128. ISSN 0360-5442. Wikidata Q133873648.
- Pawel Krzeminski; Simos Malamis; Evina Katsou (April 2017). "Membrane bioreactors – A review on recent developments in energy reduction, fouling control, novel configurations, LCA and market prospects". Journal of Membrane Science. 527: 207–227. doi:10.1016/j.memsci.2016.12.010. ISSN 0376-7388. S2CID 62838381. Wikidata Q133875828.
- Theoni Maria Massara; Simos Malamis; Albert Guisasola; Juan Antonio Baeza; Constantinos Noutsopoulos; Evina Katsou (18 April 2017). "A review on nitrous oxide (N2O) emissions during biological nutrient removal from municipal wastewater and sludge reject water". Science of the Total Environment. 596–597: 106–123. doi:10.1016/j.scitotenv.2017.03.191. ISSN 0048-9697. PMID 28426987. Wikidata Q38828404.
