= Diving safety officer =

Administrator of a US university's research diving safety program

Diving safety officer (DSO) is the title held by the person who administers a United States university's research diving safety program. They serve as a member of the institution's diving control board (DCB), and need broad technical and scientific expertise in research-related diving. Typical qualification includes training and experience as a scientific diver, regular membership in the American Academy of Underwater Sciences (AAUS), and qualification as a diving instructor from an internationally recognized certifying agency.

The diving safety officer typically reports to a senior administrative officer (president, vice president, dean, or director), and is responsible for the conduct of the scientific diving program of the institution. They have routine operational authority for this program, including the conduct of training and certification, approval of dive plans, maintenance of diving records, and ensuring compliance with this standard and all relevant regulations of the membership organization.

This organizational structure goes back to the model developed at the Scripps Institution of Oceanography in the early 1950s. The model spread from there to the other campuses of the University of California, then to other California institutions, and then nationwide. It served as the model accepted by the AAUS and the Occupational Safety and Health Administration.

== See also ==
- Diving supervisor – Professional diving team leader responsible for safety
- Diving team – Group of people working together to enhance dive safety and achieve a task
- Scientific diving – Use of diving techniques in the pursuit of scientific knowledge
- American Academy of Underwater Sciences – American diving standards organisation
