= Taha Genç =

Turkish politician (born 1979)

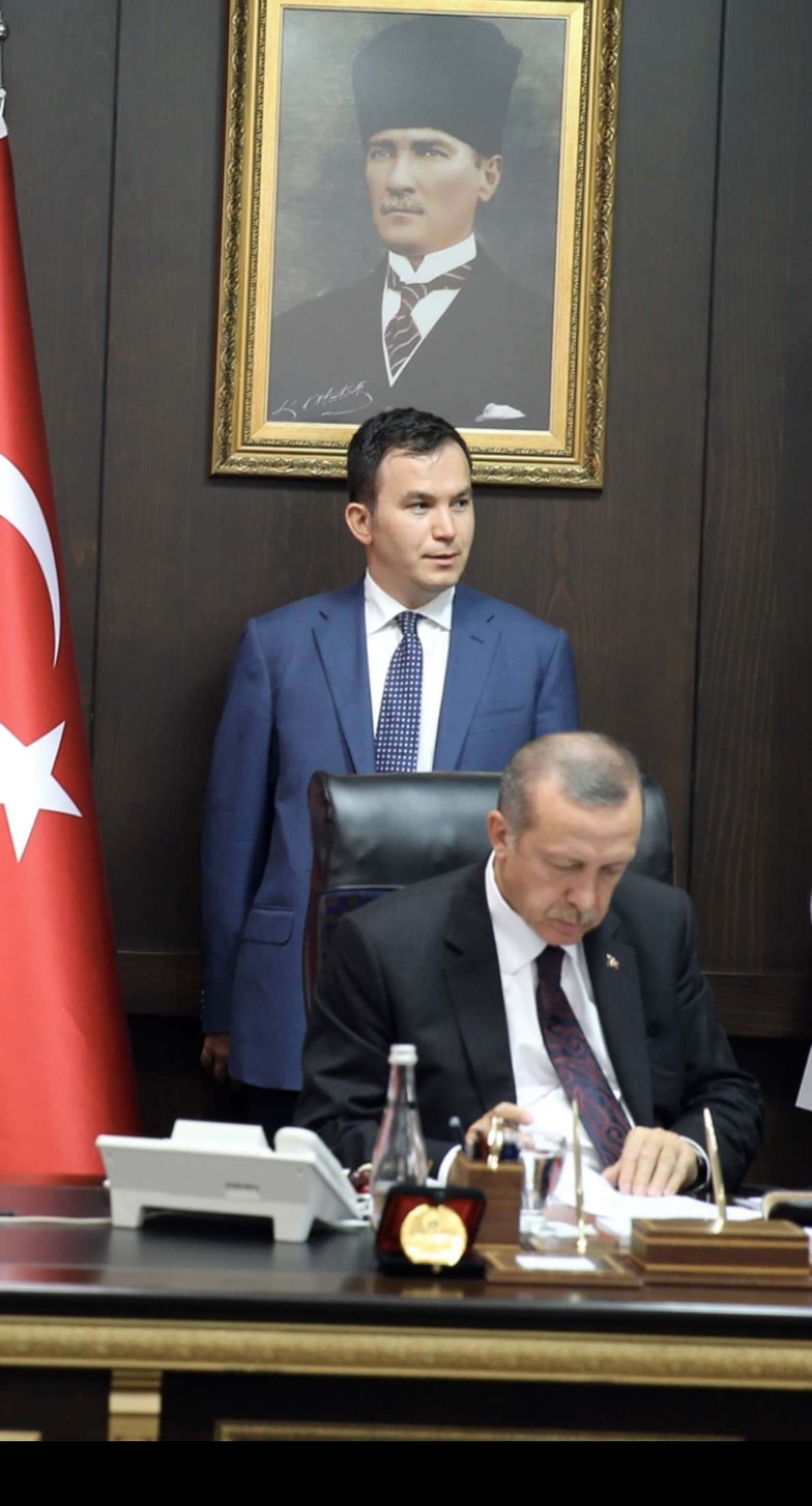

Advisor to the Prime Minister of Turkey

Personal details
- Born: 1979 (age 46–47) Istanbul, Turkey
- Education: Master from Istanbul University specialty leadership

Taha Genç (born 1979) was adviser to the Prime Minister of Turkey. Born in Istanbul, his origins are from Denizli Province in south-western Turkey.

He moved with his family to Medina, Saudi Arabia. He continued his primary education at school of Sakkaf. Also, he completed his middle school at Abdullah Ibn Abbas School. He is fluent in Arabic language, in addition to the local dialects.

After returning to Turkey, he completed his university career in İzmir at Dokuz Eylül University, then returned to Istanbul and received a master's degree in International Relations from Istanbul University. Genc started the field of consulting since his youth; he began his career as an adviser to the prime minister since 10 years ago.

Genc is an activist on social media platforms and is known as "Taha El-Turki" in the Arab countries. He is one of the few political figures who communicate directly with his followers from different countries in the world and from the Arab world in particular. Genc defines Turkish culture and teaches some Turkish words and phrases to his followers. He is also an amateur photographer, and all photographs and videos which he published on the social media are taken by himself.
