= Dokuz Eylül University =

Public university in İzmir, Turkey

Coordinates: 38.4306°N 27.1372°E

- Dokuz Eylül Üniversitesi
- Seal of Dokuz Eylül University
- Motto in English: Guided by the vision of the university of the future, we move forward together toward greater heights.
- Type: Public research university
- Established: 20 July 1982; 43 years ago
- Affiliations: EUA; BAUNAS; IAU; BSUN
- Rector: Prof. Dr. Bayram Yılmaz
- Academic staff: 2,805 (as of 2024)
- Students: 60,358 (as of 2024)
- Location: İzmir, Turkey
- Campus: Urban / Suburban
- Language: Turkish, English
- Colors: White and blue
- Website: deu.edu.tr

University rankings

Global – Overall
- CWTS World: 832 (2025)
- QS World: 1201 (2026)
- THE World: 1501 (2026)
- USNWR Global: 1408 (2025-2026)

Global – Business and economics
- THE Business and Economics: 801 (2026)

Global – Life sciences and medicine
- THE Clinical and Health: 801 (2026)
- THE Psychology: 501 (2026)

Regional – Overall
- QS Emerging Europe and Central Asia: 154 (2022)

Dokuz Eylül University (Turkish: Dokuz Eylül Üniversitesi) (DEÜ) is a public research university in İzmir, Turkey. Founded in 1982, it is organized into 18 faculties. It holds the distinction of being the first university in Turkey to implement the problem-based learning method, which was introduced in the School of Medicine in 1997.

Several units of Dokuz Eylül University have achieved continuous improvement in education, research, and practice by obtaining the ISO 9001:2000 Quality Management System certification. These include the Social Sciences Institute and the School of Maritime Business and Management in 2001, the University Presidency in 2003, and the Medical Faculty and the Health Sciences Institute in 2004.

== History ==
Founded on July 20, 1982, Dokuz Eylül University derives its name from September 9, 1922, the date marking the Liberation of İzmir from Greek occupation, a pivotal event in the Turkish War of Independence. Upon its establishment, seventeen previously existing schools, including faculties from Ege University and other higher education institutions, were affiliated with the university. Today, Dokuz Eylül University comprises eighteen faculties, five schools, six vocational schools, five graduate schools, and five research institutes.

== Campus ==
Dokuz Eylül University has 16 campuses, all located in İzmir province.

The rectorate is located in Alsancak.

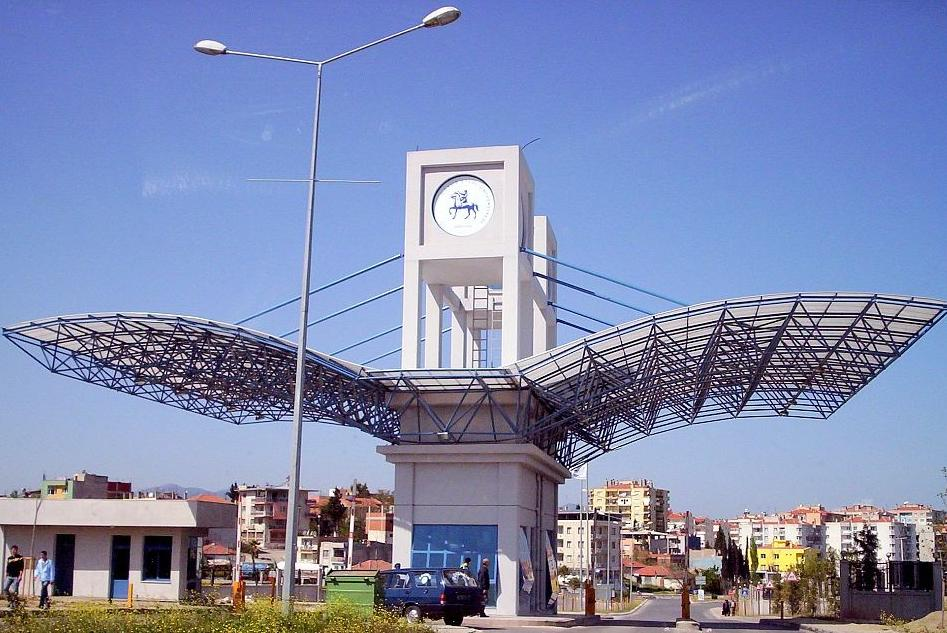
DEU Central Campus main entrance

The main campus in DEU Central Settlement (DEÜ Merkez Yerleşkesi), formerly known as Tınaztepe Campus (Tınaztepe Yerleşkesi), hosts most of the departments and the Central Library. The Central Settlement is located in the district of Buca, which is the biggest district of İzmir as terms of population.

The Dokuzçeşmeler Campus next to Hasanağa Bahçesi hosts the Faculty of Economics and Administrative Sciences. The Veterinary Faculty moved to the campus from Kiraz in 2025. The campus formerly also hosted the Faculty of Law, which was later moved to the main campus in mid-2010s.

Health-related departments except Veterinary Faculty, and the university hospital are located in 15 Temmuz Health and Art Campus (15 Temmuz Sağlık ve Sanat Yerleşkesi). The campus was formerly called as the İnciraltı Campus (İnciraltı Yerleşkesi), which was renamed in memory of the failed coup in Turkey. Dokuz Eylül University State Conservatory was formerly located in İnciraltı as well. The campus was formerly occupied by the private Near East Pharmacy Vocational School (Yakındoğu Eczacılık Yüksekokulu) which was transferred to the state in 1970s.

The hospital campus is accessible by Dokuz Eylül University Hospital station on the M1 line. The main campus on Tınaztepe is served by Tınaztepe bus station and will be served by Dokuz Eylül University Campus station on the M2 line in the future. Both of those campuses are connected through the İzmir Beltway.

== Organisation ==
The university is organized into 18 faculties.

- Buca Faculty of Education
- Faculty of Maritime
- Faculty of Science
- Faculty of Letters
- Faculty of Fine Arts
- Faculty of Nursing
- Faculty of Law
- Faculty of Economics and Administrative Sciences
- Faculty of Theology
- Faculty of Business
- Faculty of Architecture
- Faculty of Engineering
- Faculty of Tourism
- Faculty of Health Sciences
- Faculty of Physical Therapy and Rehabilitation
- Faculty of Sports Sciences
- Faculty of Medicine
- Faculty of Veterinary

The university is organized into 10 institutes.

- Graduate School of Principles of Atatürk and Turkish Revolution History
- Institute of Religious Sciences
- Graduate School of Education Sciences
- Institute of Marine Sciences and Technology
- Graduate School of Natural And Applied Sciences
- Graduate School of Fine Arts
- Izmir Biomedicine and Genome Center
- Institute of Oncology
- Graduate School of Health Sciences
- Graduate School of Social Sciences

The university is organized into 3 schools.

- State Conservatory
- School of Applied Sciences
- School of Foreign Languages

The university is organized into 6 vocational schools.

- Vocational School of Judicial Practices
- Bergama Vocational School
- Efes Vocational School
- Izmir Vocational School
- Vocational School of Health Services
- Torbalı Vocational School

== Notable alumni ==
- Didem and Sinem Balık, twin opera singers
- Vahide Perçin, actress
- Emre Aydın, rock singer
- Engin Altan Düzyatan, actor
- Öner Erkan, actor
- Şenay Gürler, actress
- Zafer İlken, academic and rector of İzmir Institute of Technology
- Bülent İnal, actor
- Cengiz Küçükayvaz, actor
- Semih Kaplanoğlu, screenwriter, film director and producer
- Betül Cemre Yıldız, chess player
- İbrahim Karagül, journalist
- Mustafa Gültepe, President of Turkish Exporters Assembly (TIM)
- Evrim Alasya, actress

== See also ==
- Dokuz Eylül University Symphony Orchestra
- Balkan Universities Network
- List of universities in İzmir
- Blue Heritage Project
