= Dokuz Eylul University Symphony Orchestra =

Dokuz Eylul University Symphony Orchestra was founded in 2001 by Dokuz Eylül University in İzmir.
