= Scientific diving =

Use of diving techniques in the pursuit of scientific knowledge

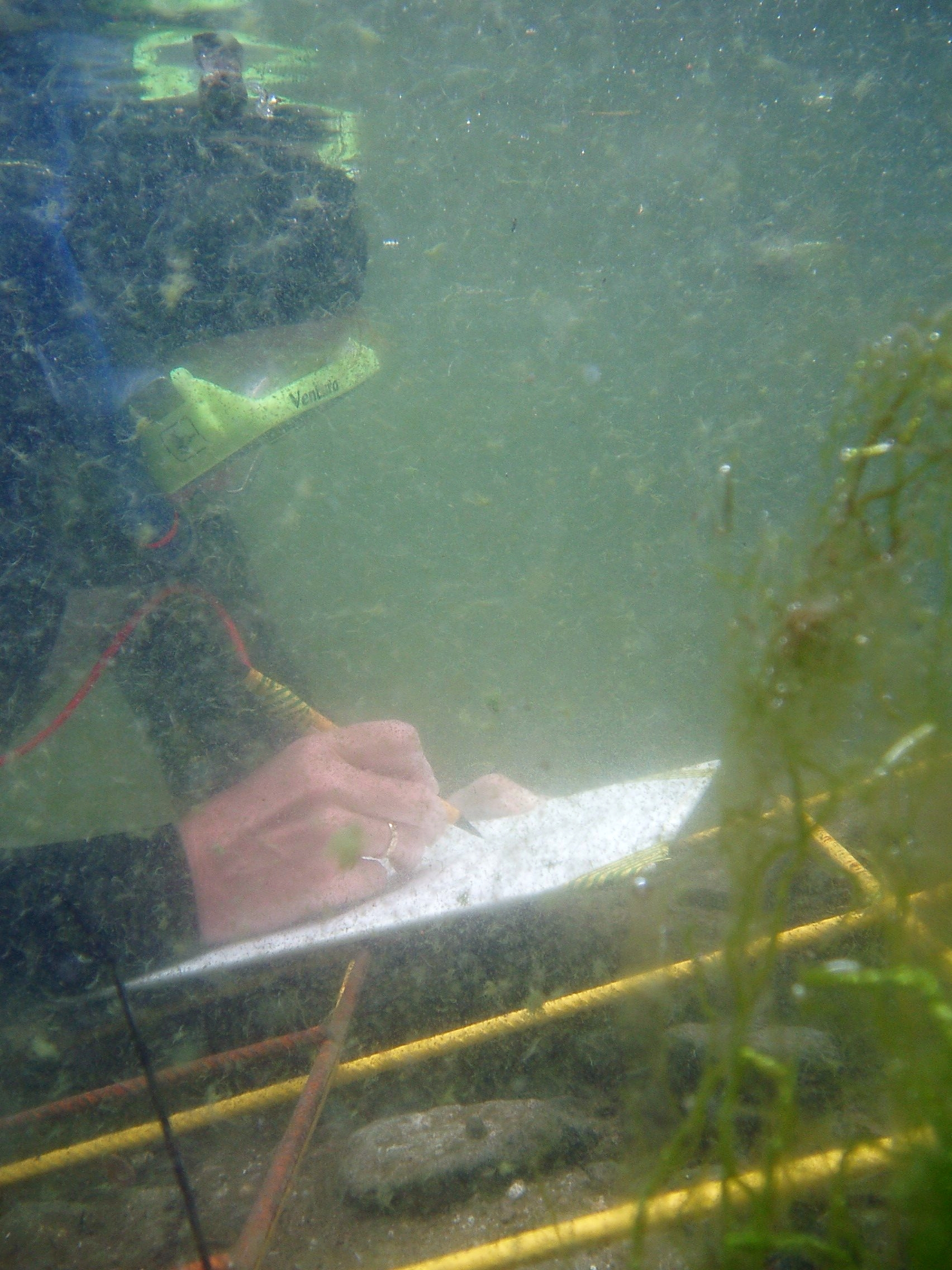
A scientific diver at work

Scientific diving is the use of underwater diving techniques by scientists to perform work underwater in the direct pursuit of scientific knowledge. The legal definition of scientific diving varies by jurisdiction. Scientific divers are normally qualified scientists first and divers second, who use diving equipment and techniques as their way to get to the location of their fieldwork. The direct observation and manipulation of marine habitats afforded to scuba-equipped scientists have transformed the marine sciences generally, and marine biology and marine chemistry in particular. Underwater archeology and geology are other examples of sciences pursued underwater. Some scientific diving is carried out by universities in support of undergraduate or postgraduate research programs, and government bodies such as the United States Environmental Protection Agency and the UK Environment Agency carry out scientific diving to recover samples of water, marine organisms and sea, lake or riverbed material to examine for signs of pollution.

Equipment used varies widely in this field, and is generally selected based on cost, effectiveness, availability and risk factors. Open-circuit scuba is most often used as it is widely available and cost-effective, and is the entry-level training mode in most places, but since the late 1990s the use of rebreather equipment has opened up previously inaccessible regions and allowed more reliable observations of animal behaviour.

Scientific diving in the course of employment may be regulated by occupational safety legislation, or may be exempted as self-regulated by a recognised body. The safety record has generally been good. Collection of scientific data by volunteers outside of employment is generally considered to legally be recreational diving.

Training standards vary throughout the world, and are generally higher than for entry level recreational diving, and in some cases identical to commercial diver training. There are a few international agreements that facilitate scientists from different places working together on projects of common interest, by recognising mutually acceptable minimum levels of competence.

== Scope of work ==
Scientific diving is any diving undertaken in the support of science, so activities are widely varied and may include visual counts and measurements of organisms in situ, collection of samples, surveys, photography, videography, video mosaicing, benthic coring, coral coring, placement, maintenance and retrieval of scientific equipment.

The importance of diving to the scientific community is not well recorded. A bibliographic analysis of papers published between 1995 and 2006 that have been supported by scientific diving shows that diving supports scientific research through efficient and targeted sampling. Activities include collection of organisms and biological samples, observing animal behaviour, quantitative surveys, in situ measurements, impact studies, ecological analyses, evaluation of techniques, mapping underwater areas, profiling geology, and deploying and retrieving underwater equipment.

A comparison of database searches against a selection of publications known to have used scientific diving in the same period, shows that a small minority of papers were discovered, suggesting that the importance of scientific diving as a valid and cost-effective underwater research tool is greatly underrepresented in the literature.

Some underwater work in support of science is out of scope of the relevant regulations, exemptions, or codes of practice, and is not legally classed as scientific diving. This work is required to be done by divers trained, registered, and operating following commercial diving health and safety practices.

=== Contribution of scientific diving to research ===
Underwater diving interventions, particularly on scuba, provide the capacity for scientists to make direct observations on site and in real time, which allow for ground-truthing of larger scale observations and occasional serendipitous observations outside the planned experiment. Human dexterity remains less expensive and more adaptable to unexpected complexities in experimental setup than remotely operated and robotic alternatives in the shallower depth ranges. Scuba has also provided insights which would be unlikely to occur without direct observation, where hypotheses produced by deductive reasoning have not predicted interactive and behavioural characteristics of marine organisms, and these would not be likely to be detected from remote sensing or video or other methods which do not provide the full context and detail available to the diver. Scuba allows the scientist to set up the experiment and be present to observe unforeseen alternatives to the hypothesis.

The field of global change biology includes investigation of evidence relating to global warming and ocean acidification. Many of the measurable changes in global climate occur in the sea. Coral bleaching is an example of an indicator of change, and scuba diving has provided a large amount of low-impact observational data contributing significantly to the large body of knowledge on the subject over several decades.

The field of ocean acidification and the impact of anthropogenic carbon dioxide emission has seen similar growth and most of the cited articles in this field have relied to a significant extent on data collected during scuba diving operations.

The field of paleoclimate reconstruction has a major influence on the understanding of evolution and the ecological and biogeographic past, as climate is the most powerful driver of evolution. Coring corals on a reef in the least harmful and most focused manner is currently most practicable using scuba technology. This mining of the past makes it possible to attempt to predict future climate.

Advances in training and accessibility to trimix diving and closed circuit rebreather systems has enabled scientific divers to reach highly diverse deeper mesophotic reefs which may be the corals last refuge from the warming of surface waters.

The current knowledge of the functioning of the ecologically and economically important hard-bottom communities in the shallow water coastal zones is both limited and particularly difficult to study due to poor accessibility for surface operated instrumentation as a result of topographic and structural complexity which inhibit remote sampling of organisms in the benthic boundary layer. In situ assessments by scientific divers remain the most flexible tool for exploring this habitat and allow precise and optimised location of instruments.

The capacity to dive under polar ice provides an opportunity to advance science in a restricted environment at relatively low cost. A small number of holes in the ice can provide access over a large area and high levels of experimental replication. Divers are a flexible and reliable method for deploying, maintaining and retrieving equipment from under‐ice environments, and are relatively cost efficient for researching remote locations that, would otherwise require the use of more expensive research vessels.

The global threat to marine ecosystems due to over‐exploitation, habitat loss, pollution and climate change is exacerbated by introduction of alien species, which is considered to be one of the leading causes of extinctions and biodiversity loss. Scientific divers are the most competent to detect the presence of potentially invasive species and in some cases can provide a quick response. Monitoring the effectiveness of response also requires diver intervention.

Underwater archaeology has developed considerably over the past century, and diving allows a site to be excavated with minimal disturbance of the site or damage to artifacts.

It was observed that personal intervention by the scientist allowed more accurately targeted observations and less incidental damage compared to blind sampling from the surface, and that the observation of the subject by the scientist can provide valuable and often unexpected data. There are also phenomena and organisms that are difficult or impossible to observe except by being there, and places that are difficult to access other than by going there in person. It is difficult to determine the full scope of underwater science in the past, as not all work or methodologies have been published.

==== Diving activities in support of research ====
- Sampling: Diving is highly selective and useful for sampling delicate materials or organisms, and for collecting from specific locations or associations, it can be more efficient than sampling methods relying on chance, and can be cost-effective compared with the use of research vessels. In some cases there is no other way to gain access to the specimen, or the specimen must be actively searched for and visually identified, before extracting it from a complex environment without damage. Diving can produce higher quality samples with less collateral damage. Specimen collection of animals is more prevalent, but algal specimen and sediment core collection by diver can produce better quality samples in many cases.
- Survey and quantitative observation: Surveys and quantitative assessments may comprise quantitative descriptions of biotic assemblages, distribution or abundance of a species or group or other feature, or relate the topography of the seafloor to the distribution of a species or group. There are examples where ROVs and video surveys have been used for these purposes, and the alternatives each have their advantages.
- Animal behaviour: Behaviour tends to be studied by direct observation, video or time lapse photography. In many cases the equipment is deployed and recovered by divers, allowing judgement to be exercised in the setting up process. There is debate on the extent of the influence of divers and monitoring equipment on animal behaviour, and the behaviour may be influenced by the type of equipment used by divers using open or closed circuit equipment, as the noise and presence of bubbles is known to affect fish behaviour. Reproductive behaviour, territoriality, predator-prey interaction and movement have been studied.
- In situ measurement: In situ measurements by divers eliminates the need to remove the target from the water. This has the potential for more accurate data with less disturbance of the environment, but is not always practicable.
- Impact and/or pollution studies: Diver observation can be quick and effective at identifying the scope and extent of disturbances, and samples and measurements can be taken where effects are observed, but risk to the diver must be considered, and in some instances the presence of the diver may constitute a significant impact, and studies have been done to assess the environmental impact of recreational divers on fragile tropical reef or cave environments.
- Ecological studies: The study of distribution, abundance and interactions between organisms and with the environment is a combination of activities already mentioned. The presence of a diver allows serendipitous observations to be followed up in real time, which is particularly valuable when the observation is a rare occurrence.
- New species or first reports: Discovery of new species or recording range extensions relies on first noticing the presence of the organism, then recognising that it is unexpected, and either making a collection or recording sufficient evidence of presence and identity. There is no adequate substitute for the presence of a sufficiently knowledgeable diver with the right equipment. In many cases unexpected organisms have been observed, reported, and never found again.
- Technique evaluation: The evaluation of new techniques and the comparison between existing techniques of investigation and data gathering is a common procedure, not only for techniques used by divers, but also of the operation of remotely controlled equipment and surface deployed equipment. Observation of the operational performance can identify flaws and potential for improved design of equipment and operation and help validate the method.
- Mapping and/or ground-truthing: Direct survey by divers may be necessary or preferable, depending on what is to be mapped. Distribution maps require the targeted subjects to be recognised reliably and accurately, and in some cases this can only be done by an expert observer. Remote mapping technologies require validation of accuracy, precision and reliability. Various methods may be used, including using divers to physically validate points on the map.
- Geology or geological profiling: This is uncommon, but can include straightforward observations of the general submerged geology and distribution of sedimentary facies, and the collection of samples.
- Deployment and/or retrieval: Diver deployment and retrieval of apparatus allows careful and precise placement, which may be necessary to gather the desired data, or to avoid adverse impact on the environment. Recovery may also require careful work, to avoid damage to environment or equipment.
- Hydrothermal studies: Divers have been used to locate, identify and sample from isolated or specific vents.
- Tag/recapture: Divers have been used to tag and recapture animals. This may be relatively easy with slow-moving benthic species, but can be quite difficult with others. In situ tagging and release exposes the subject to less risk of barotrauma.
- Biotechnology and/or pharmacology: Targeted collecting of species for pharmacological investigation should improve the probability of new discoveries, but this is equally valid for other methods of directed collection.
- Geochemistry and/or biogeochemistry: Divers have been used to sample distribution of surface sediments, and to take core-drilled samples of coral reefs.

=== Modes of diving ===
Scientific diving may use any mode of diving that is best suited to the project. Scientific diving operations may use and have used freediving, scuba open circuit, scuba closed circuit, surface oriented surface-supplied systems, saturation diving from surface or underwater habitats, atmospheric suit diving or remotely operated underwater vehicles. Breathing gases used include air, oxygen, nitrox, trimix, heliox and experimental mixtures. The study of diving physiology and diving medicine often requires experimental diving operations to generate data.

=== Branches of science frequently using diving ===
- Fisheries science – Academic discipline of managing and understanding fisheries
- Freshwater biology – Scientific study of freshwater ecosystems and biology
- Hydrology – Science of the movement, distribution, and quality of water on Earth
- Limnology – Science of inland aquatic ecosystems
- Marine biology – Scientific study of ocean life
- Ocean chemistry – Chemistry of oceans and seas
- Marine ecology – The study of the interactions between organisms and environment in the sea
- Marine geology – Study of the history and structure of the ocean floor
- Oceanography – Scientific study of the ocean
- Underwater archaeology – Study of human activity via evidence found underwater

=== Other fields which may use scientific diving ===
- Aquaculture – Farming of aquatic organisms
- Environmental protection – Practice of protecting the natural environment

=== Citizen science ===
Several citizen science projects use observational input from recreational divers to provide reliable data on presence and distribution of marine organisms. The ready availability of digital underwater cameras makes collection of such observations easy and the permanence of the record allows peer and expert review. Such projects include the Australian-based Reef Life Survey, and the more international iNaturalist project, based in California, which is only partly focused on marine species.

In most cases diving for citizen science purposes is not considered occupational diving and therefore does not fall under the occupational health and safety regulations, as each diver is autonomous and personally responsible for the planning and execution of their dives. Any agreement between two dive buddies regarding mutual duty of care should follow established legislation for that purpose, if it exists in the relevant jurisdiction. If the diver is under the direction of a person appointed by an organisation, this exclusion may fall away as the appointed person becomes responsible for health and safety at the dive site, and the organisation assumes the duty of care of an employer.

== History ==
The first recorded U.S. scientific diver was Dr. William H. Longley, starting in 1910, and who made the first underwater colour photograph with National Geographic staff photographer Charles Martin in 1926 off the Florida Keys in the Gulf of Mexico.

By the middle of the 20th century, scientific diving was being done around the U.S. in surface supplied shallow water helmets and standard diving dress.

During WWII Jacques Cousteau and Frédéric Dumas used the Aqua-Lung for underwater archaeology to excavate a large mound of amphorae near Grand Congloué, an island near Marseilles.

The first scientific diver at Scripps Institution of Oceanography was Cheng Kwai Tseng, a biologist from China and graduate student during World War II, who used Japanese surface-supplied equipment to collect algae off the San Diego coast in 1944. In 1947, Frank Haymaker made observations in Scripps Canyon using a similar surface-supplied diving helmet.

In 1949 Conrad Limbaugh introduced scientific scuba diving at Scripps Institution of Oceanography. While a doctoral student in 1954 he became Scripps' first diving safety officer, his research diving course was the first civilian diver training programme in the U.S. and he wrote the first scientific diving manual.

Limbaugh and researcher Andreas Rechnitzer purchased an Aqua-lung when they became available, and taught themselves to use it, as no formal training was available. They introduced the equipment to Scripps researchers in 1950, and it was found suitable for making direct observations and to conduct experiments underwater.

In 1951, after the death of two of their scientific divers, Scripps decided that there was a need for formalized scientific diver training, and in 1954 instituted the first formal scientific diving program in the U.S.

At the request of the University of California Office of the President, the divers at Scripps developed the first "University Guide for Diving Safety," which was initially published in March 1967.

In the 1950s through 1970s scientific diving in the U.S. was conducted by various organizations using similar but informal self-regulated standards.

Professor George Bass of Texas A & M University pioneered the field of underwater archaeology from 1960, mostly in the Mediterranean

In 1975 the United Brotherhood of Carpenters and Joiners of America petitioned for an emergency temporary standard be issued with respect to occupational diving operations. The ETS issued on June 15, 1976 was to be effective from July 15, 1976 but was challenged in the US Court of Appeals by several diving contractors, and was withdrawn in November 1976. A permanent standard for commercial diving became effective on 20 October 1977, but it did not consider the needs of scientific diving. The scientific diving community was unable to operate as previously, and in 1977 united to form the American Academy of Underwater Sciences (AAUS)

After extensive negotiation and congressional hearings, a partial exemption to the commercial diving standards was issued in 1982, and was re-examined in 1984, leading to the final guidelines for the exemption which became effective in 1985 (Federal Register, Vol. 50, No. 6, p. 1046)

In 1988 Unesco published the Code of Practice for Scientific Diving: Principles for the safe practice of scientific diving in different environments, authored by the CMAS Scientific Committee.

There is a project to harmonise the status of scientific diving in Europe by the European Scientific Diving Panel based on the European Scientific Diver and Advanced European Scientific Diver qualifications, which is intended to allow mobility of scientific divers and operations throughout Europe.

The UK HSE divides activities broadly included in the field into media, scientific, and archaeological diving. In several countries diving for research purposes is governed by occupational health and safety regulations. The US operates under the AAUS guidelines which allow considerable flexibility regarding equipment and procedures based on principles of acceptable safety, and restrict operations to activities recognised as scientific work, though some activities are excluded due to higher risk.

Dr Richard Pyle has pioneered US development of diving standards for scientific projects at greater depths since the 1990s, which has opened up learning about an extended range of ecological zones and their biota.

Work on international nature research often includes volunteer divers acting as citizen scientists, who gather observational data and record the changing underwater environment. Much of this is done as recreational divers, as part of distributed projects, but they may also be directly involved in scientific diving operations where this is legally permitted.

== Management and control of scientific diving operations ==
Scientific diving operations which are part of the work of an organisation are generally under the control of a diving supervisor or equivalent, and follow procedures similar to other professional diving operations.

A scientific diving operation that follows the usual procedures of a commercial scuba operation will include one or more working divers, a stand-by diver and a supervisor, who will manage the operation from the surface control point. If the divers are tethered, there will generally be a line tender for each tethered diver in the water The stand-by diver may remain out of the water at the surface or may accompany the working diver or divers in the water. Surface-supplied and saturation operations will also generally follow standard procedures used by commercial divers.

Other scientific diving is on projects under the control and direction of the scientists doing the diving, and where this is the case there may be a system with less rigid control as the divers have more responsibility and autonomy. The US works to such a system, where there is an exemption from commercial diving regulation and scientific diving is self-regulated within a national association.

=== Diving control board ===
The American system has a diving control board taking overall responsibility for all scientific diving work done by an organisation. The diving safety officer is responsible to the board for operational, diving and safety matters. For each dive, one scientist, designated as the lead diver, must be present at the site during that entire operation, and is responsible for management of the dive, including dive planning, briefing, emergency planning, equipment and procedures. The divers operate in a strict buddy diving system.

=== Dive planning ===
As scientific diving is by definition done in pursuit of scientific knowledge, there is a purpose to each dive and therefore there will be a plan to safely and effectively achieve that purpose.

== Standard and emergency diving procedures ==
The standard procedures for scuba and surface-supplied diving are essentially the same as for any other similar diving operation using similar equipment in a similar environment, by both recreational, technical and other professional divers. There are a few special cases where scientific diving operations are carried out in places where other divers would generally not go, such as blue-water diving. Scientific dives tend to be more task oriented than recreational dives, as the scientist is primarily there to gather data, and the diving is of secondary importance, as the way to get to the worksite.

== Working procedures common to scientific diving ==
The requirements for qualification as a scientific diver vary with jurisdiction. The European Scientific Diver (ESD) standard is reasonably representative:

Competence in work methods common to scientific projects:

- Diver navigation methods.
- Underwater search methods.
- Survey methods suitable for accurately locating and marking objects and sites.
- The use of lifting bags for controlled lifts, and airlifts for excavations and sampling.
- Basic rigging and rope work, including the assembly and deployment of transects and search patterns.
- Recording methods.
- Sampling techniques appropriate to the scientific discipline.

=== Underwater navigation ===
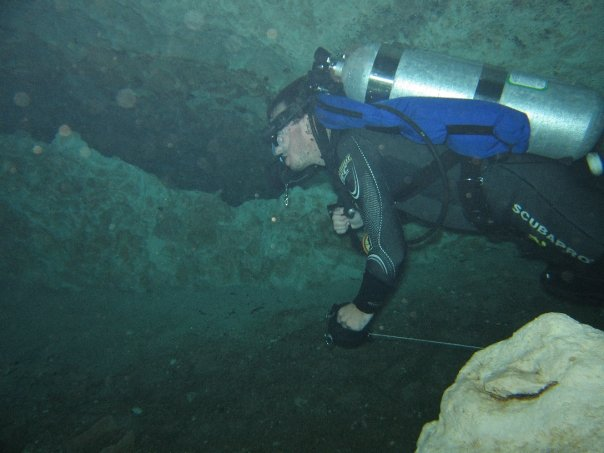
A cave diver running a distance line into the overhead environment to facilitate a safe exit

Underwater navigation by divers is broadly split into three categories. Natural navigation techniques, and orienteering, which is navigation focused upon the use of an underwater magnetic compass. and following a guide line.

Natural navigation, sometimes known as pilotage, involves orienting by naturally observable phenomena, such as sunlight, water movement, bottom composition (for example, sand ripples run parallel to the direction of the wave front, which tends to run parallel to the shore), bottom contour and noise. Although natural navigation is taught on courses, developing the skills is generally more a matter of experience.

Orienteering, or compass navigation, is a matter of training, practice and familiarity with the use of underwater compasses, combined with various techniques for reckoning distance underwater, including kick cycles (one complete upward and downward sweep of a kick), time, air consumption and occasionally by actual measurement. Kick cycles depend on the diver's finning technique and equipment, but are generally more reliable than time, which is critically dependent on speed, or air consumption, which is critically dependent on depth, work rate, diver fitness, and equipment drag. Techniques for direct measurement also vary, from the use of calibrated distance lines or surveyor's tape measures, to a mechanism like an impeller log, to pacing off the distance along the bottom with the arms.

Skilled underwater navigators use techniques from both of these categories in a seamless combination, using the compass to navigate between landmarks over longer distances and in poor visibility, while making use of the generic oceanographic indicators to help stay on course and as a check that there is no mistake with the bearing, and then recognising landmarks and using them with the remembered topography of a familiar site to confirm position.

Guide lines, also known as guidelines, cave lines, distance lines, penetration lines and jackstays are permanent or temporary lines laid by divers to mark a route, particularly in caves, wrecks and other areas where the way out from an overhead environment may not be obvious. Guide lines are also useful in the event of silt out.

Distance lines are wound on to a spool or a reel. The length of the distance line used is dependent on the plan for the dive. Reels for distance lines may have a locking mechanism, ratchet or adjustable drag to control deployment of the line and a winding handle to help keep slack line under control and rewind line. The material used for any given distance line will vary based on intended use. The use of guide line for navigation requires careful attention to laying and securing the line, line following, marking, referencing, positioning, teamwork, and communication.

A transect line is a special case of a guide line commonly used in scientific diving. It is a line laid to guide the diver on a survey along the line. In cases where position along the line must be accurately specified, a surveyor's tape or chain may be used as the transect line.

=== Searches ===
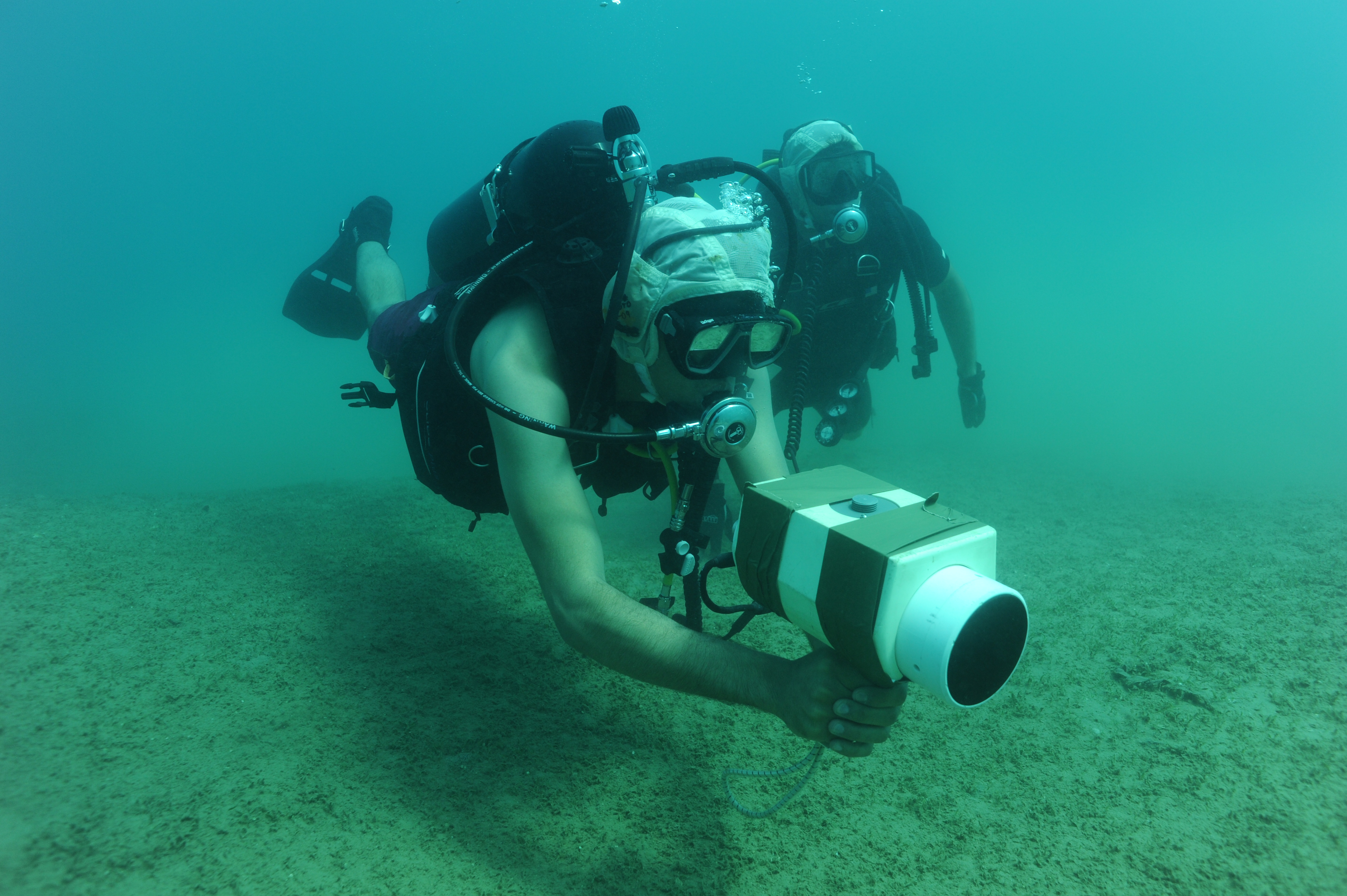
US Navy diver training in the use of a hand held sonar device

Searches are often required to find the subject of study, or to recover previously placed instrumentation. There are a number of techniques in general use. Some of these are suitable for scuba, and some for surface supplied diving. The choice of search technique will depend on logistical factors, terrain, protocol and diver skills.

As a general principle, a search method attempts to provide 100% coverage of the search area. this is greatly influenced by the width of the sweep. In conditions of zero visibility this is as far as the diver can feel with his hands while proceeding along the pattern. When visibility is better, it depends on the distance at which the target can be seen from the pattern. In all cases then, the pattern should be accurate and completely cover the search area without excessive redundancy or missed areas. Overlap is needed to compensate for inaccuracy, and may be necessary to avoid gaps in some patterns. Common search patterns include:

- Circular search – a diver swims at a series of distances (radii) around a fixed reference point. The circular search is simple and requires little equipment. It is useful where the position of the objects of the search is known with reasonable accuracy.
- Pendulum searches – a variation on the circular search where the diver stops and changes direction at the end of each arc.
- Jackstay search – divers swim along a search line – the jackstay, while searching to the sides. There are various techniques for performing a jackstay search.
- Compass searches – search patterns controlled by compass directions.
- Towed searches – divers are towed behind a boat while searching visually.
- Sonar assisted searches – Divers search using a sonar transponder. Active transponders that emit a signal and measure the return signal strength to determine obstructions in a given direction, or passive transponders which measure a signal emitted by the target can be used.

=== Collection, sampling, tagging and recording ===
Most scientific fieldwork involves some form of data collection. In some cases, it is on-site measurement of physical data, and sometimes it involves taking samples, usually recording the circumstances in some detail. Video, still photography and manual listing of measurements and labeling of specimens are common practice. Biological and geological specimens are usually bagged and labelled for positive identification, and the availability of underwater cameras allows in-situ and bagged photographs to be taken for reference. Biological specimens may also be tagged and released, or have small biopsies taken for DNA analysis. When non-extractive measurements are made, video and still photography provide backup for listed data. Recording on prepared sheets is preferred where practicable as writing underwater is relatively inefficient, and often not very legible. Waterproof paper on a clipboard or a waterproof slate are commonly used for written records. Ordinary graphite pencils work fairly well underwater, though the wood tends to split after a while.

=== Surveys, measurement and mapping ===
Types of survey:

- Census – Compilation of information about a given population
- Quadrat – Rectangular frame used to demarcate a part of the substrate for detailed analysis
- Transect – Path along which organisms are recorded
- Photogrammetry, also known as Photographic survey – Taking measurements using photography
- Geological survey – Investigation of the geology in a region for creating a geological map – measurement of strike and dip, classification of facies.
- Measurement of profiles of reef and sand, Rugosity.
- Bathymetry – Study of underwater depth of lake or ocean floors
- Archaeological site survey – Non-destructive exploration of the archaeological material in a given areas

Measurement can be an intrinsic part of surveys, or may be associated with sampling.

Geographical location may be necessary or desirable to identify a specific location at which data is collected. Various levels of precision are possible, usually more difficult to achieve than terrestrial geolocation.

Mapping of an underwater site may be necessary for analysis of the data. Several methods are available. A map is the two or three dimensional representation of geographic survey data following a standardised format, often using symbolic representations of data, and often to a specified scale.

== Risk and safety ==
Generally, scientific diving has a history of relatively low risk and good safety record overall, the vast majority of dives are relatively shallow and in reasonably good conditions. Most scientific dives can be deferred when conditions are sub-optimal, and seldom require the use of dangerous equipment. This has allowed a good safety record in spite of relatively relaxed equipment and training requirements for occupational diving.

The earliest scientific diving safety programme in the US was established at the Scripps Institution of Oceanography in 1954, about 5 years before the development of the national recreational scuba training agencies. Most American scientific diving programmes are based on elements of the original Scripps diving programme.

=== Safety record ===
A survey of some half a million scientific dives reported 7 fatalities and 21 cases of decompression illness. These rates are lower than those previously reported for military personnel, recreational divers in the UK, recreational divers in the Caribbean, recreational divers in western Canada and wreck divers in cold water.

Nitrox has been used for open circuit scientific diving since the early 1970s with no evidence of increased DCS risk in comparison with similar air dives.

A maximum oxygen partial pressure of 1.6 bar has been found generally acceptable for open circuit nitrox diving by the scientific community, and it has not been found necessary to screen for carbon dioxide retention.

Investigation of the order of dive profiles has shown no statistical increase of decompression sickness risk in reverse profile diving. No validity was found for the rule of diving progressively shallower in successive no-decompression dives imposed by some recreational diver training organisations.

As of 1992 the prevalence of decompression illness in the United States was estimated at one case per 100,000 dives for the scientific diving community. This may be compared with approximately one case per 1000 dives for commercial diving and one case per 5000 dives for recreational diving. The reported decompression sickness rate of 1:100,000 over 50 years appears to be acceptable to the scientific diving community. Diving profiles resemble recreational diving more than other sectors, but the incident rate in scientific diving is an order of magnitude lower than for recreational diving. This has been attributed to more thorough entry-level and continued training, better supervision and operational procedures and medical and fitness screening.

A survey of just over a million scientific dives by AAUS members between January 1998 through December 2007 yielded a total of 95 valid incident reports, for an all-incidents rate of 0.931/10,000 person-dives. Detailed review showed that 33 of these involved decompression illness giving an incidence for DCI of 0.324/10,000 person-dives, including some ambiguous cases. This rate is lower than published rates for recreational, instructional, dive guide, commercial and military diving, but higher than the 1992 estimate.

== Demographics ==
In the United States scientific diving is done by research institutions, universities, museums, aquaria, and consulting companies for purposes of research, education and environmental monitoring. As of 2005 there were an estimated 4000 scientific divers, of which a small number are career scientific divers, with an average age of around 40 years, and a larger number of students in the 18 to 34 year age group. There is no specific upper age limit providing the diver remains medically fit to dive. The lower limit is determined by the age of students qualifying for training. About a quarter are female.

== Regulation of scientific diving ==
Scientific diving is generally considered to be occupational diving, and is usually regulated as such except where specifically exempted.

=== Exemptions ===
In the US, scientific diving is exempted from the requirements of the Federal Occupational Safety and Health regulations, provided that it complies with the requirements specified for the exemption.

=== Governance and representation organisations ===
Scientific diving governance organizations include:

- The Australian Scientific Divers Association
- The American Academy of Underwater Sciences – American diving standards organisation
- The European Scientific Diving Panel – A panel of the European Network of Marine Research Institutes and Stations.
  - Belgium Working Group on Scientific Diving
  - Bulgarian National Association of Underwater Activity and Institute of Oceanology
  - Koordinacija znanstvenih ronilaca Hrvatske – Coordination of scientific divers of Croatia
  - Estonian Marine Institute (Eesti Mereinstituut), University of Tartu
  - Finnish Scientific Diving Steering Association [Suomen tutkimussukelluksen ohjausyhdistys]
  - Comité National de la Plongée Scientifique-CNPS (France)
  - German Commission for Scientific Diving (KFT) [Kommission Forschungstauchen Deutschland]
  - Hellenic Center for Marine Research (Greece)
  - Associazione Italiana Operatori Scientifici Subacquei (Italian Association of Scientific Divers)
  - Coastal Research and Planning Institute, Klaipeda University (Lithuania)
  - Ministry of Social Affairs and Employment (Netherlands)
  - Scientific diving in Norway is regulated by the Norwegian Labour Inspection Authority, under the national regulations for professional diving.
  - APorMC – Portuguese Scientific Diving Association
  - The Swedish Scientific Diving Committee
  - Istanbul University, Institute of Marine Sciences and Management (Turkey)
  - UK Natural Environment Research Council (NERC) and UK Scientific Diving Supervisory Committee
- The Diving Advisory Board to the Department of Employment and Labour (South Africa)

== Training and registration of scientific divers ==
When a scientific diving operation is part of the duties of the diver as an employee, the operation may be considered a professional diving operation subject to regulation as such. In these cases the training and registration may follow the same requirements as for other professional divers, or may include training standards specifically intended for scientific diving. In other cases, where the divers are in full control of their own diving operation, including planning and safety, diving as volunteers, the occupational health and safety regulations may not apply.

Where scientific diving is exempt from commercial diving regulation, training requirements may differ considerably, and in some cases basic scientific diver training and certification may not differ much from entry level recreational diver training.

Technological advances have made it possible for scientific divers to accomplish more on a dive, but they have also increased the complexity and the task loading of both the diving equipment and the work done, and consequently require higher levels of training and preparation to safely and effectively use this technology. It is preferable for effective learning and safety that such specialisation training is done systematically and under controlled conditions, rather than on site and on the job. Environmental conditions for training should include exercises in conditions as close as reasonably practicable to field conditions.

=== Training requirements ===
The requirements for qualification as a scientific diver vary with jurisdiction. The European Scientific Diver (ESD) standard is reasonably representative:

The person may be required to already be qualified as a scientist or scientific technician, or be in training for such qualifications, and medically fit to dive.

Basic skills and underlying knowledge must include:

- The fundamental physics and physiology of diving, including the causes of diving related disorders and illnesses and their effects and management.
- The specific problems associated with diving, including calculations of breathing gas requirements and the correct use of decompression tables.
- Correct selection, safe use and user maintenance of appropriate open circuit scuba diving equipment, including personal dive computers.
- Basic diving skills and standard scuba diving procedures
- Tending a tethered diver from the surface.
- The principles of dive planning.
- The diving regulations, codes of practice, and responsibilities relevant to working as a member of a scientific diving team .

Emergency skills include competence in:

- Diving first aid, including cardiopulmonary resuscitation (CPR) and oxygen administration to diving casualties.
- Standard emergency procedures and diving casualty management.
- Scuba rescue techniques and management of casualties in and under the water.

Further training for special equipment, such as closed circuit mixed gas rebreathers, extended range, or special tasks may be required. As of 2016 there were three sets of rebreather standards for scientific diving in the US, those of the American Academy of Underwater Sciences (AAUS), National Park Service (NPS) and National Oceanic and Atmospheric Administration (NOAA).

All three organisations require full scientific diver status with nitrox certification as prerequisite, NOAA requires certification to 130 feet (40 m) and 100 open water dive, while AAUS and NPS require 100 feet (30 m) and 50 open water dives. Each agency specifies stepwise certification to increasing depths, and certification is valid only for the rebreather type trained on, for environmental conditions similar to those during training. Classroom training includes theory review of topics included in open circuit training, and decompression and dive planning appropriate to the chosen unit. More technical topics include system design and operation, pre-dive setup and testing, post-dive break down and maintenance, oxygen exposure and decompression management, dive operations planning, problem recognition and management specific to the chosen unit. Practical skills training includes system calibration and operation checks, preparation and management of absorbent canisters, breathing loop assembly, non-return valve function and pressure checks, gas analysis, pre-breathing function assessment, buoyancy control, system monitoring during the dive, bailout procedures, and system user maintenance, and experience exposure by way of minimum hours of underwater time under supervised conditions.

== International variations and cooperation ==
=== Australia ===
Although the first scientific diving expedition in Australia was carried out by Sir Maurice Yonge to the Great Barrier Reef in 1928, most scientific diving did not start until 1952 when the Commonwealth Scientific and Industrial Research Organisation began work to understand the pearl beds of northern Australia in 1957. Commercial divers worked under Australian Standard CZ18 "Work in Compressed Air" in 1972. This standard applied to caisson workers and divers so the underwater work was drafted into AS 2299 "Underwater Air Breathing Operations" in 1979. In 1987, a re-write of AS 2299 included scientific diving in the regulations even though the divers had been self-regulating under the Australian Marine Sciences Association (AMSA). At that time, the AMSA and the Australian Institute for Maritime Archaeology (AIMA) began a collaboration to draft a new standard for scientific diving.

=== Germany ===
In the 1960s there were no regulations for scientific diving in Germany, but two fatal accidents in 1969 led to the implementation of guidelines for scientific diving based on the commercial diving guidelines. These define the equipment, training, protocols and legal background for scientific diving for German universities, research institutes and government organisations. Divers trained to these requirements are mostly science students or technicians, and are subsequently registered as scientific divers.

Scientific diving is done by a diver in the water, monitored by a dive tender at the surface, controlled by a dive operation leader (supervisor) and with a standby diver on site. Diving equipment can include full-face mask and dry suit. Most dives do not require decompression stops.

All German scientists and students need the "Certified research diver / European Scientific Diver" qualification to conduct scientific diving work, which is based on the German Health and Safety at Work Act () and the Rule for Safety at Work GUV-R 2112 Operation of Scientific Divers. There are seven certified training centres where the qualification Geprüfter Forschungstaucher (Certified Research Diver) can be obtained.

=== Poland ===
In Poland, the beginnings of scientific diving are associated with Prof. Roman Wojtusiak, who used an open surface supplied helmet commissioned in 1935, and used from 1936 for biological observations and experiments in Poland and Yugoslavia. Polish units involved in scientific diving include the Polish Academy of Sciences in Sopot, and the University of Gdańsk, which carried out biological observations and installed measuring equipment. The Central Maritime Museum of Gdańsk carried out research on a large number of wrecks in the Baltic sea. Other units involved in underwater archaeology and training of divers for this work include the Nicolaus Copernicus University in Toruń and the University of Warsaw. Poland had a problem with scientific diving in that for natural sciences it was legally classified as recreational diving, but for archeology it was considered underwater work, until the act of 17 October 2003 classified scientific diving as professional diving, and the Act of 9 May 2014 then exempted scuba diving for research purposes organised by universities and research institutes.

=== South Africa ===
In South Africa, scientific diving is considered a form of commercial diving and is within the scope of the Diving Regulations 2009 and the Code of Practice for Scientific Diving published by the Chief Inspector of the Department of Employment and Labour, Under DR 2009 the Codes of Practice are guidance and not compulsory practice. They are provided as recommended good practice, and in theory need not be followed providing an acceptable level of safety is achieved in terms of the Occupational Health and Safety Act No.85 of 1993. However, in this case the onus is on the diving contractor to ensure acceptable safety during the diving operation based on risk assessment. The level of safety required is specified in the OHS act as "reasonably practicable" taking into account a number of factors, including cost effectiveness, availability of technology for mitigation and available knowledge of hazards. Use of the relatively flexible scientific code rather than the default Code of Practice for Inshore Diving is restricted to clients which are registered as organisations engaged in either scientific research or higher education.

The qualification required to dive at work in South Africa is linked to the mode of diving, the equipment to be used, and the diving environment. There are six classes of occupational diver registration, all of which may be employed in scientific diving operations within the scope of the specified competence and when supported by the required infrastructure.

- Class 1 divers are competent to do saturation dives while supervised by a class I supervisor.
- Class 2 divers are competent to do surface orientated open bell dives to a maximum depth of 70 msw, while supervised by a Class 2 supervisor.
- Class 3 divers are competent to do surface supplied dives to a maximum depth of 50 msw while supervised by a Class 3 supervisor.
- Class 4 divers are competent to do open circuit scuba dives to a maximum depth of 30 msw while supervised by a class 4 supervisor.
- Class 5 divers are competent to do open circuit scuba dives for scientific work to a maximum depth of 20 msw while supervised by a class 4 supervisor.
- Class 6 divers are competent to do open circuit scuba dives in a benign environment to a maximum depth of 8 msw while supervised by a class 4 supervisor.

In each of these classes, the fundamental diving or supervisory competences include those of the class with the next higher number, though specialist skills may differ from person to person and may have no obvious connection to the registered class. All scientific dives must be under the supervision of a registered diving supervisor of a class appropriate to the specific diving operation.

Most scientific diving in South Africa is done on open circuit scuba by Class 4 and 5 divers as no-stop dives on air or nitrox. The Code of Practice for Scientific Diving allows for the use of alternative modes and technologies provided appropriate competence is achieved by training and assessment, and the risk of the project is assessed as acceptable by both the organisation and the members of the diving team. Minimum personnel requirements are as stated in the Diving Regulations, and may only be varied under authorisation of an exemption from the Chief Inspector of the Department of Employment and Labour.

Training of scientific divers can be done at any commercial diving school registered with the Department of Employment and Labour. There is no distinction between scientific and other commercial diving registration. The Research Diving Unit of the University of Cape Town has specialised in training divers to Class 3, 4 and 5 for scientific work continuously since the mid-20th century, and is the university's in-house diving contractor.

=== United Kingdom ===
As diving is an activity that is considered to put the diver at a higher than normal risk to health, in the UK all diving at work, including scientific diving, is regulated through the Diving at Work Regulations, 1997 and the associated approved codes of practice, which are implemented by the Health and Safety Executive. The code of practice for scientific diving also covers archaeological diving and diving in public aquariums. The professional body representing the scientific and archaeological diving sector is the Scientific Diving Supervisory Committee (SDSC), and it is responsible to the Natural Environment Research Council

The determining factors indicating that a person is diving at work, and therefore are subject to the regulations, are:

- The diving is done as part of the person's work – they are paid to do it, or
- If diving out of working hours, or as a student or volunteer, the data obtained from the diving activity goes towards publication with some academic or financial value and
- The diving operation is within UK territorial waters.

HSE regulations are only enforceable within UK waters, but operations from UK registered merchant vessels may also require adherence to the regulations and codes of practice.

Undergraduate students and volunteers are generally not regarded as being at work, but if diving as part of an organised event or programme, the diving contractor will still have a duty of care. Postgraduate students are more likely to be considered at work when the diving is a significant part of their research.

=== United States ===
In the United States scientific diving is permitted by the Occupational Safety and Health Administration (OSHA) to operate under an alternative consensual standard of practice that is maintained by the American Academy of Underwater Sciences.

29 CFR Part 1910 – Subpart T "Commercial Diving Operations," establishes mandatory occupational safety and health requirements for commercial diving operations which apply wherever OSHA has statutory jurisdiction. This covers the inland and coastal territorial waters of the United States and possessions.

The United Brotherhood of Carpenters and Joiners of America petitioned the Federal Government in 1975 to issue an emergency temporary standard covering all professional diving operations, which was issued on June 15, 1976, to be effective from July 15, 1976. This was challenged in the US Court of Appeals and was withdrawn in November 1976. A permanent standard for commercial diving was subsequently formulated which became effective from October 20, 1977. The American Academy of Underwater Sciences applied for an exemption for scientific diving, citing 20 years of self-regulation and a lower accident rate than the commercial diving industry. An exemption was issued effective from November 28, 1982, after negotiation.

To be able to avail itself of the Scientific Diving Exemption the institution under whose auspices the work is carried out must meet four tests:

1. The Diving Control Board consisting of a majority of active scientific divers must have autonomous and absolute authority over the scientific diving program's operations.
2. The purpose of all projects using scientific diving is the advancement of science; therefore, information and data resulting from the project are non-proprietary.
3. The tasks of a scientific diver are those of an observer and data gatherer. Construction and trouble-shooting tasks traditionally associated with commercial diving are not included within scientific diving.
4. Scientific divers, based on the nature of their activities, must use scientific expertise in studying the underwater environment and, therefore, are scientists or scientists in training.

The AAUS promulgates and regularly reviews the consensus based Standards for Scientific Diving Certification and Operation of Scientific Diving Programs, which is a guideline for scientific diving programs in the US, and also used in some other countries. this document is currently the "Standard" of the scientific diving community and must be followed by all organizational members, these standards allow for reciprocity between institutions, and are widely used throughout the United States and some foreign countries.

The AAUS uses three levels of scientific diver authorisation:

- Diver-in-Training signifies that the diver has completed entry-level training requirements through a recognised recreational scuba certification agency or scientific diving programme.
- Scientific Diver certification is a permit to dive using compressed air within no-decompression limits.
- Temporary Diver authorisation is issued following a demonstration of the required competence and if the person can contribute significantly to a planned dive. It is valid only for a specific operation and is subject to the standard policies, regulations and standards.

There are also depth limitations which may be incrementally increased based on satisfactory experience, for 9 msw, 18 msw, 30 msw, 40 msw 45 msw and 58 msw. A range of specialty qualifications may follow additional training and assessment. These are: decompression diving, surface-supplied diving, mixed-gas diving, nitrox diving, rebreather diving, lock-out and saturation diving, blue-water diving, drysuit diving, overhead environment diving, altitude diving, and use of dive computers for decompression monitoring.

=== International scientific cooperation ===
Various methods may be used to allow for international recognition of scientific divers, allowing them to work together on projects. In some cases the professional diver qualifications may be mutually recognised between countries, and in other cases the exemption allows the controlling bodies to make the necessary arrangements.

==== Europe ====
The European Scientific Diving Panel (ESDP) is the European platform for the advancement of underwater scientific excellence and to promote and provide a practical support framework for scientific diving at a European scale. The ESDP was initiated in 2008 as a European Marine Board Panel (until April 2017) and currently is receiving organizational support from the European network of Marine Stations (MARS).

The following countries are members of the ESDP as of 2020:

- Belgium (statutory member)
- Bulgaria (member)
- Croatia (member)
- Finland (statutory member)
- France (statutory member)
- Germany (statutory member)
- Greece (candidate member)
- Italy (member)
- Norway (statutory member)
- Poland (candidate member)
- Portugal (member)
- Slovenia (candidate member)
- Sweden (statutory member)
- United Kingdom (statutory member)

The ESDP is intended to maintain and develop a system for recognition of scientific diving competencies issued by member states, which may be issued under various training routes and levels of national legislation, to facilitate participation and mobility by diving scientists in European research programmes, and to improve diving safety, quality of science, and underwater techniques and technologies.

Two levels of scientific diver registration are recognised: the European Scientific Diver (ESD) and the Advanced European Scientific Diver (AESD). AESDs are qualified to lead scientific diving trips, while ESDs are only permitted to take part. These represent the minimum level of training and competence required to allow scientists to participate freely throughout the countries of the European Union in underwater research projects diving using scuba. Certification or registration by an authorized national agency is a prerequisite, and depth and breathing gas limitations may apply.

This competence may be gained either through a formal training program, by in the field training and experience under appropriate supervision, or by a combination of these methods. These standards specify the minimum basic training and competence for scientific divers, and do not consider any speciality skill requirements by employers. Further training for job-specific competence is additional to the basic competence implied by the registration.

All member countries of the European Union are expected in terms of directive EEC 92/51 to recognise one or both of these training levels. An applicant who satisfies the requirements will be issued with either an ESD or an AESD certificate that is valid for five years, and must be renewed every five years by application to the issuing authority. The certificate holders must comply with all national and local rules regarding medical fitness, workplace safety, insurance, and limitations on scientific diving activities when engaged in scientific diving in a host member country. The certificate only indicates previously assessed competence to the training level, and not the current level of competence.

=== Standards, reference manuals and codes of practice ===
- ISO 8804-1:2024 Requirements for the training of scientific divers. Part 1: Scientific divers.
- ISO 8804-2:2024 Requirements for the training of scientific divers. Part 2: Advanced scientific divers.
- ISO 8804-3:2024 Requirements for the training of scientific divers. Part 3: Scientific diving project leader.
- Standards For Scientific Diving. Dauphin Island, Alabama: The American Academy of Underwater Sciences. 2013.
- CMAS Scientific Committee (1988). Code of Practice for Scientific Diving: Principles for the safe practice of scientific diving in different environments (PDF). UNESCO technocal papers in marine science 53. UNESCO.
- NOAA Diving Manual: Diving for Science and Technology – Training and operations manual for scientific diving
- Haddock, Stephen H. D.; Heine, John N. (2005). Scientific Blue-Water Diving (PDF). California Sea Grant College Program. Archived from the original (PDF) on 2016-03-25.
- Diving Advisory Board. Code Of Practice for Scientific Diving (PDF). Pretoria: The South African Department of Labour. Archived from the original (PDF) on 2016-11-09.
- Approved Code of Practice: Scientific and archaeological diving projects (Diving at Work Regulations 1997). Norwich: HSE Books. 1998. p. 26.
- The Diving at Work Regulations 1997. United Kingdom Parliament Statutory Instrument No. 2776. 1997.
- Advice Notes for the Scientific and Archaeological Approved Code of Practice. The Scientific Diving Supervisory Committee (SDSC).
- "Standards for European Scientific Divers (ESD) and Advanced European Scientific Divers (AESD)". Workshop of the interim European Scientific Diving Committee. Banyuls-sur-mer, France: European Scientific Diving Committee. 24 October 2000.
- "Common Practices for Recognition of European Competency Levels for Scientific Diving at Work" (PDF). 2. European Scientific Diving Panel. October 2009.
- "The delivery of science through diving: a review of recent scientific highlights and the framework for occupational scientific diving in Europe" (PDF). European Scientific Diving Panel. May 2011. Archived from the original (PDF) on 2018-11-23.
- "Guidelines for Scientific Diving from large Research Vessels" (PDF). European Scientific Diving Panel. September 2011.

== Gallery ==
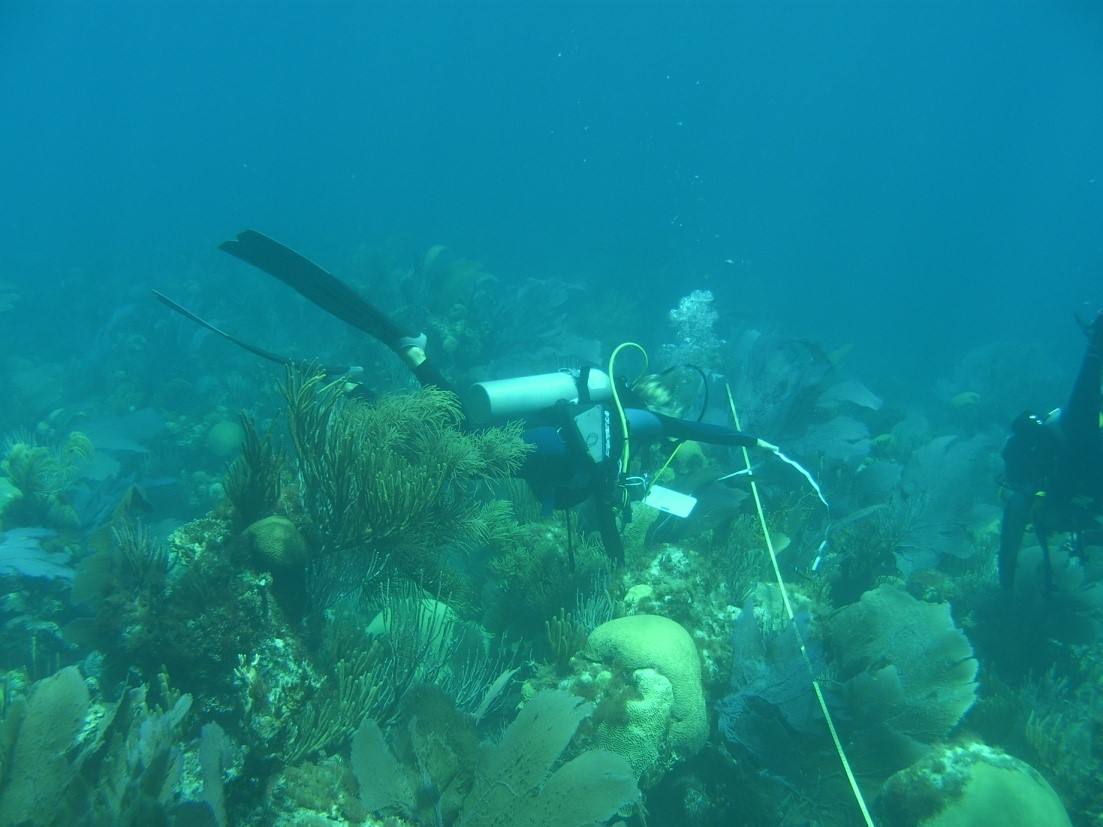
Measuring the size of gorgonians along a transect in a coral reef of Bermuda.

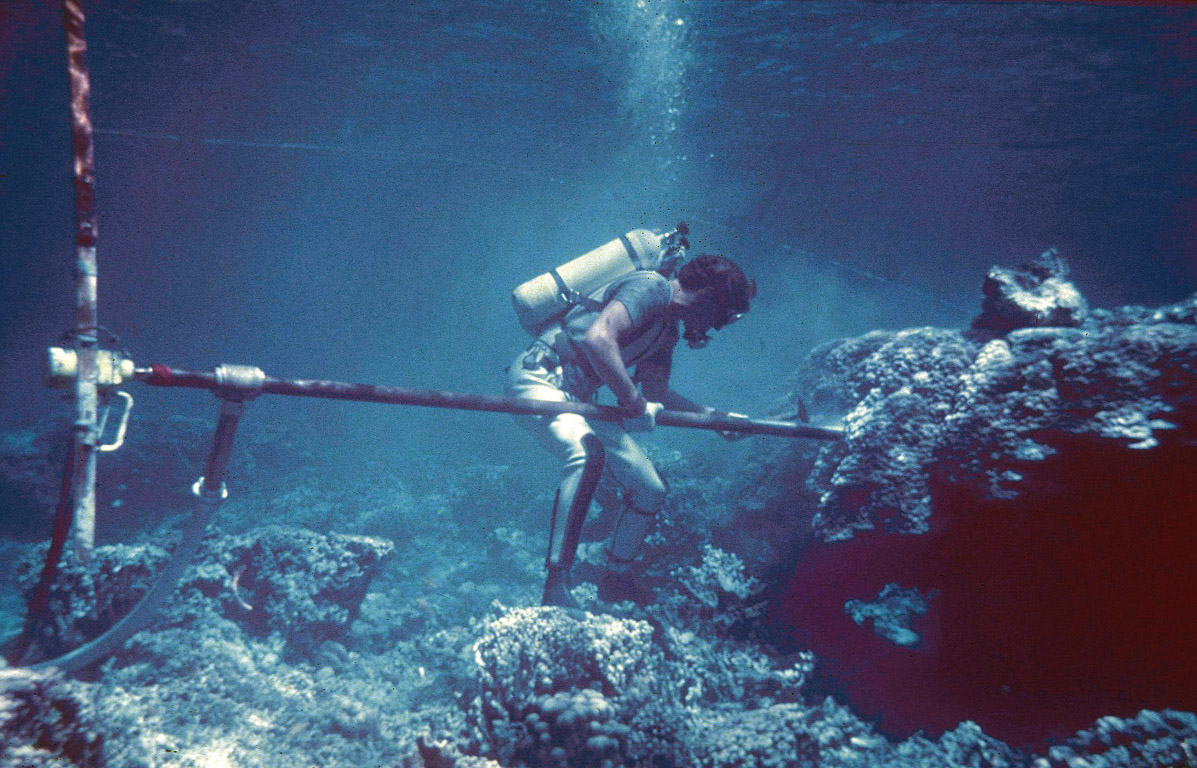
Coral drilling to recover a core for studying paleoclimate change.

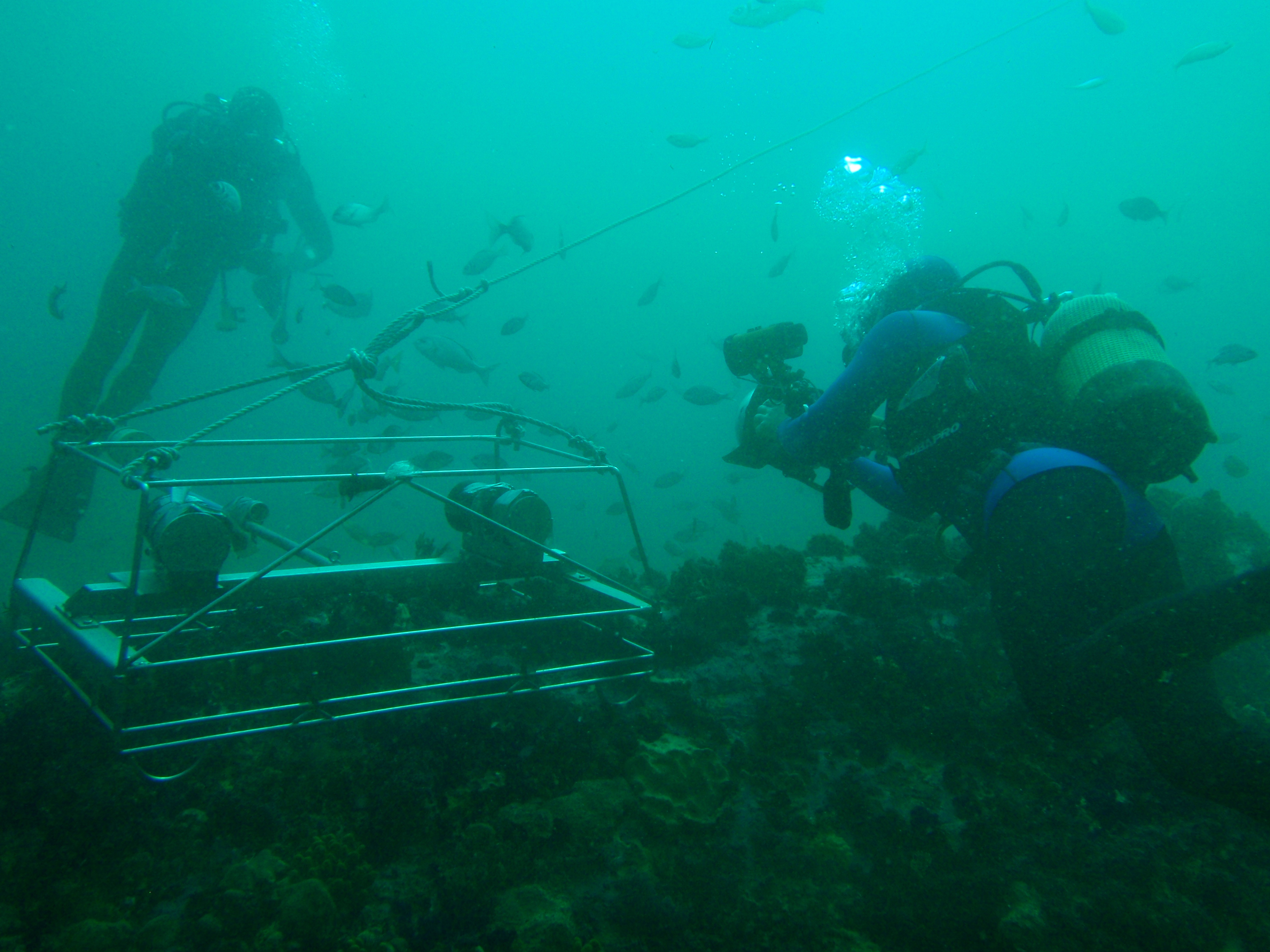
Divers inspecting a stereo baited remote underwater video (BRUV) frame at Rheeder's Reef in the Tsitsikamma Marine Protected Area

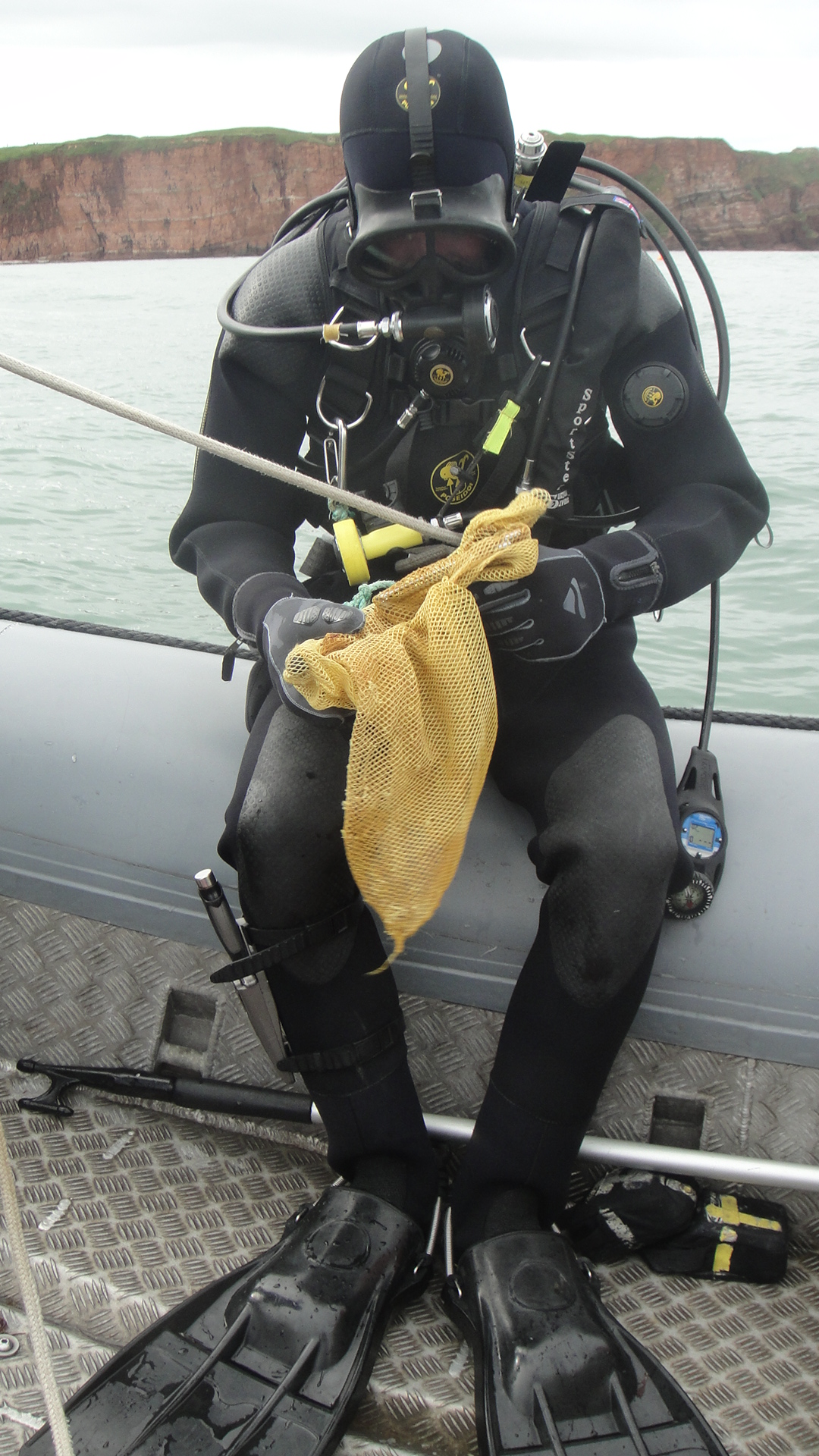
Scientific Diving equipment for cold water

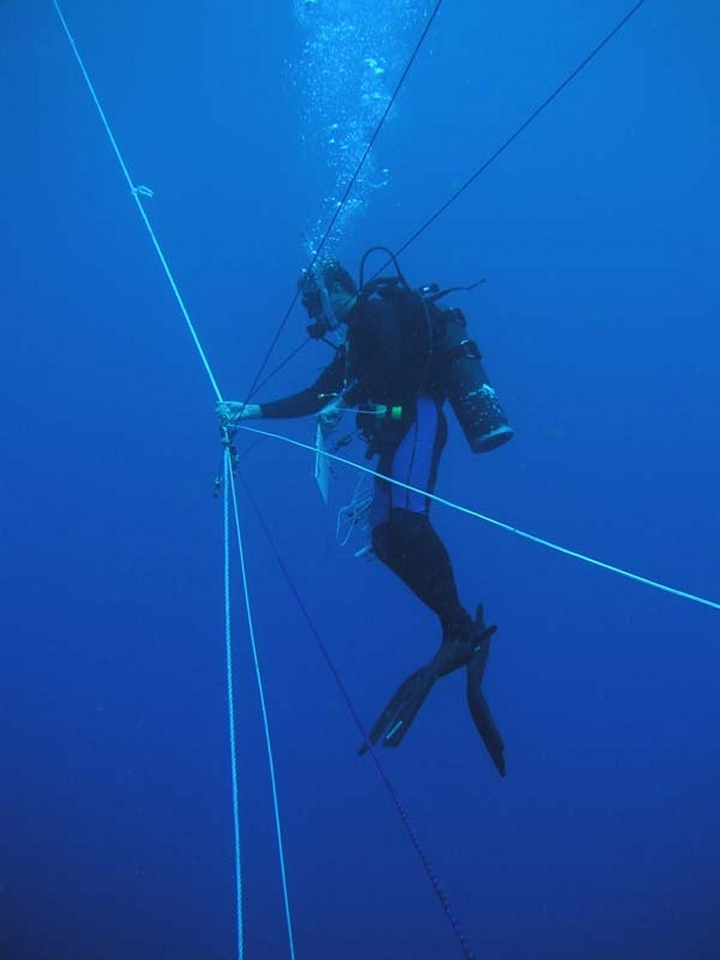
Marine scientist safety diver coordinates a blue-water dive for 4 companions - each at the end of a rope tether and each rope kept taut by a weight and pulley system.

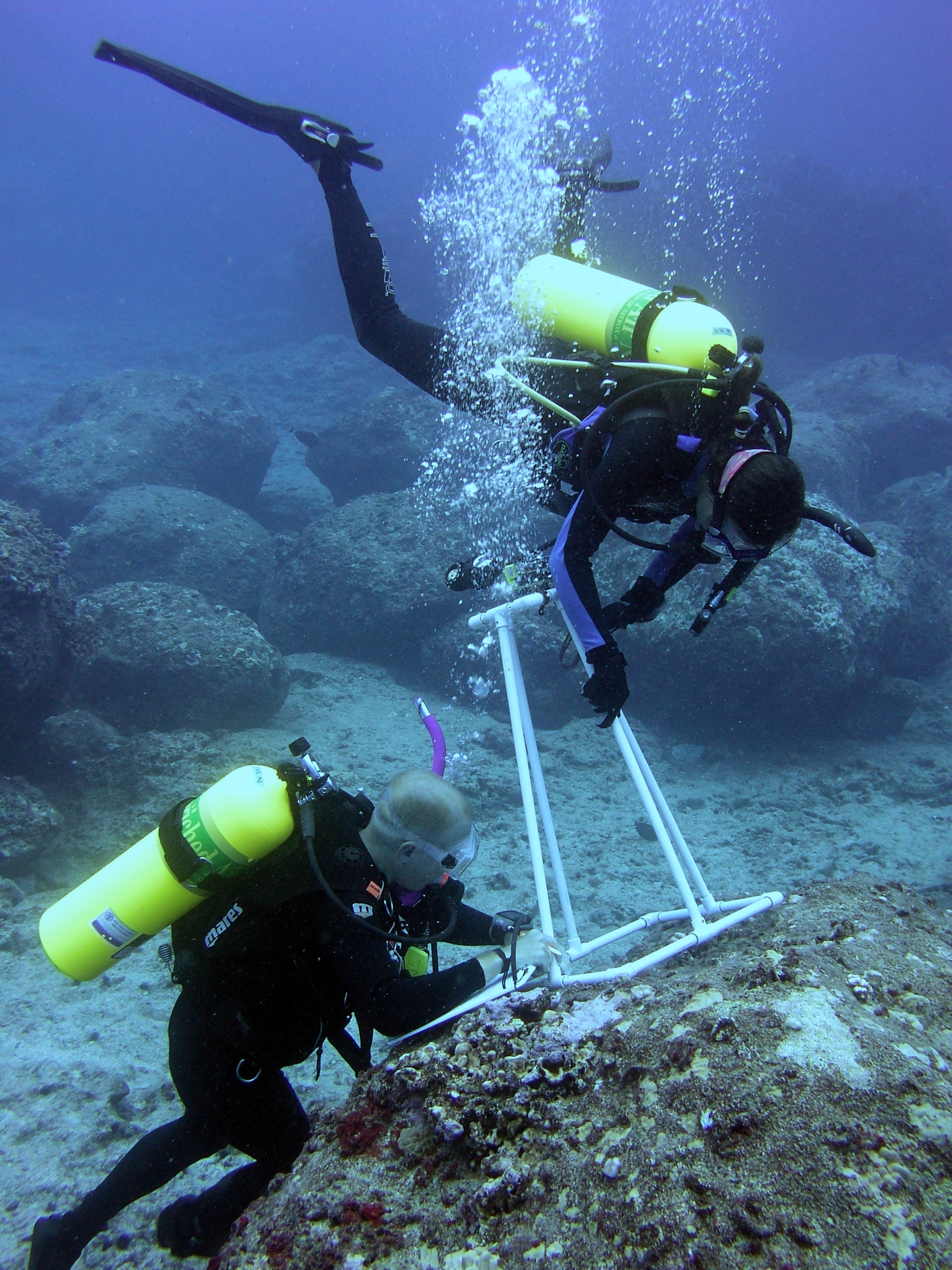
A biologist records algal diversity within a photo-quadrat during an underwater survey at Midway Atoll. Hawaii, Northwestern Hawaiian Islands.

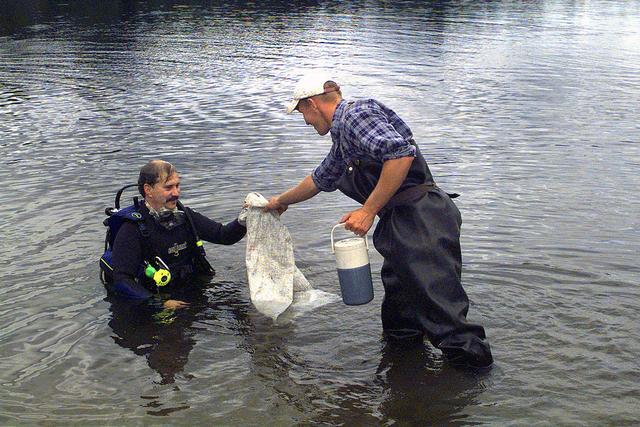
Collecting samples of the Eurasian Watermilfoil (Myriophyllum spicatum) plant which threatens fish in Sandy Lake

== See also ==
- Ichthyology – Scientific study of fish
- Marine ecology – The study of the interactions between organisms and environment in the sea
- Phycology – Branch of biology concerned with the study of algae
