= Balık Sisters =

Turkish twin opera singers

Didem and Sinem Balik
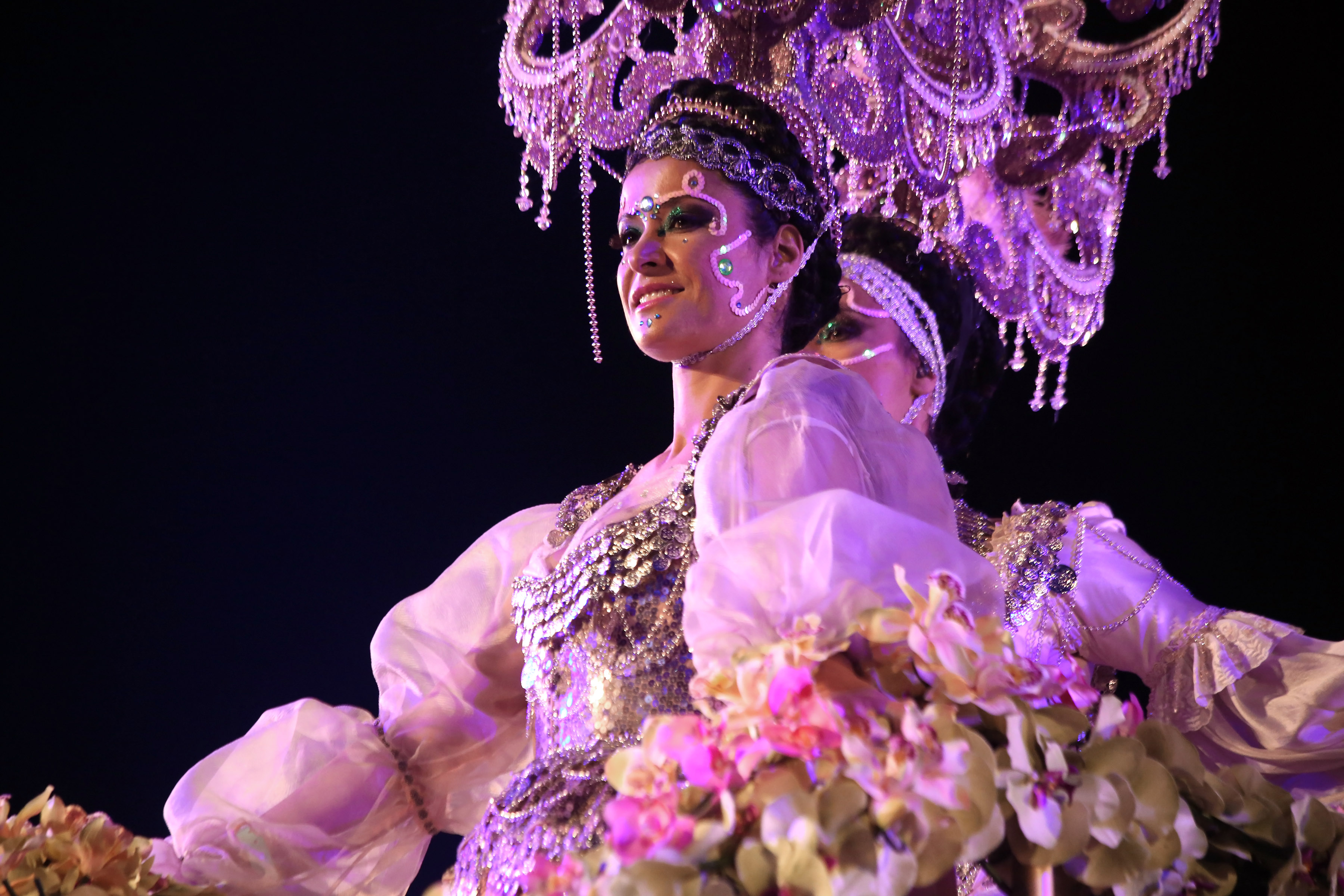
- The Balık Sisters at Life Ball 2013
- Born: May 21, 1974 (age 51)
- Occupation: Opera singers
- Years active: 1999-present
- Known for: Only identical twin opera singers performing professionally

The Balık Sisters are an opera act composed of Turkish identical twin sisters Didem Balık and Sinem Balık (born May 21, 1974). Didem is a mezzo-soprano while Sinem is a soprano. The sisters, who claim to be the only identical twin opera singers performing professionally, are also known by the nickname "the Opera twins." Since 2000, Didem and Sinem have been living and performing in Vienna, Austria.

== Early life ==
Born in İzmir, Turkey, Didem is five minutes older than Sinem. They have three younger brothers. The twin's study of music began when they were only four years old, before they could read and write. Their music teacher taught them musical notation with the help of colors; they remembered that red denoted C, blue D, yellow E, lilac F, and so on. At age of nine, the Balıks left piano playing and dedicated themselves to singing.

The twins were educated in the State Conservatory of Dokuz Eylül University in İzmir, and then attended the master classes of Lia Lantieri (1998), Katia Ricciarelli (2000), Dolora Zajick (2000–2003) and Plácido Domingo (2003–2004). Their teachers were Tanju Nebol, Toma Popescu and Francisco Gutierrez. They continued their education in Prayner Conservatory of Vienna in Austria between 2001 and 2003.

== Career ==
Following the graduation from the conservatory in İzmir, they won the audition at the Cemal Reşit Rey Concert Hall in Istanbul and started singing there. In 1999, the twins entered an audition at the Aspendos International Opera and Ballet Festival in Antalya, where they were discovered by Toma Popescu, an expert lecturer in singing at the Vienna Music Academy. After their further education in Vienna, Didem and Sinem gave several concerts in Europe and also in the United States. The Balık sisters wore traditional Turkish clothing kaftan at their appearances with Turkish music.

In addition to operas, the sisters sing operettas, Broadway musicals, French melodies, Italian Neapolitans and lieder.

In 2001, the sisters were finalists at the "4th International de Vivo Voix Competition".

The sisters performed concerts throughout the world, including; New York, Washington DC, Antalya, Ankara, İstanbul, İzmir, Düsseldorf, Essen, Frankfurt, Galaz and performed at very special venues like Vienna City Hall, United Nations, Hoffburg Palace, Turkish Embassy in Vienna, Düsseldorf Parliament Building, European Parliament and Startmore Music Center. They performed in front of many VIP guests such as Turkish and Austrian Presidents, King of Benin, European MPs, princes and princesses. They have been invited to make guest appearances to many important international festivals.

Plácido Domingo said of them “they are perfect for the sister role in Cosi Fan Tutte of Mozart, I see no reason for them not to have a universal career”. After listening to them at a concert in New York, Ahmet Ertegün, the founder of Atlantic Records, suggested that everybody should hear the OperTwins sing and that he was smitten by them.

They studied repertoire, technique and interpretation with the famous American Mezzo Soprano Dolora Zajick who said that "Opera is one of the highest forms of art and deserves the best best quality artists, and the OperaTwins definitely have this potential".
