= Hussam Jouhara =

Professor of thermal engineering

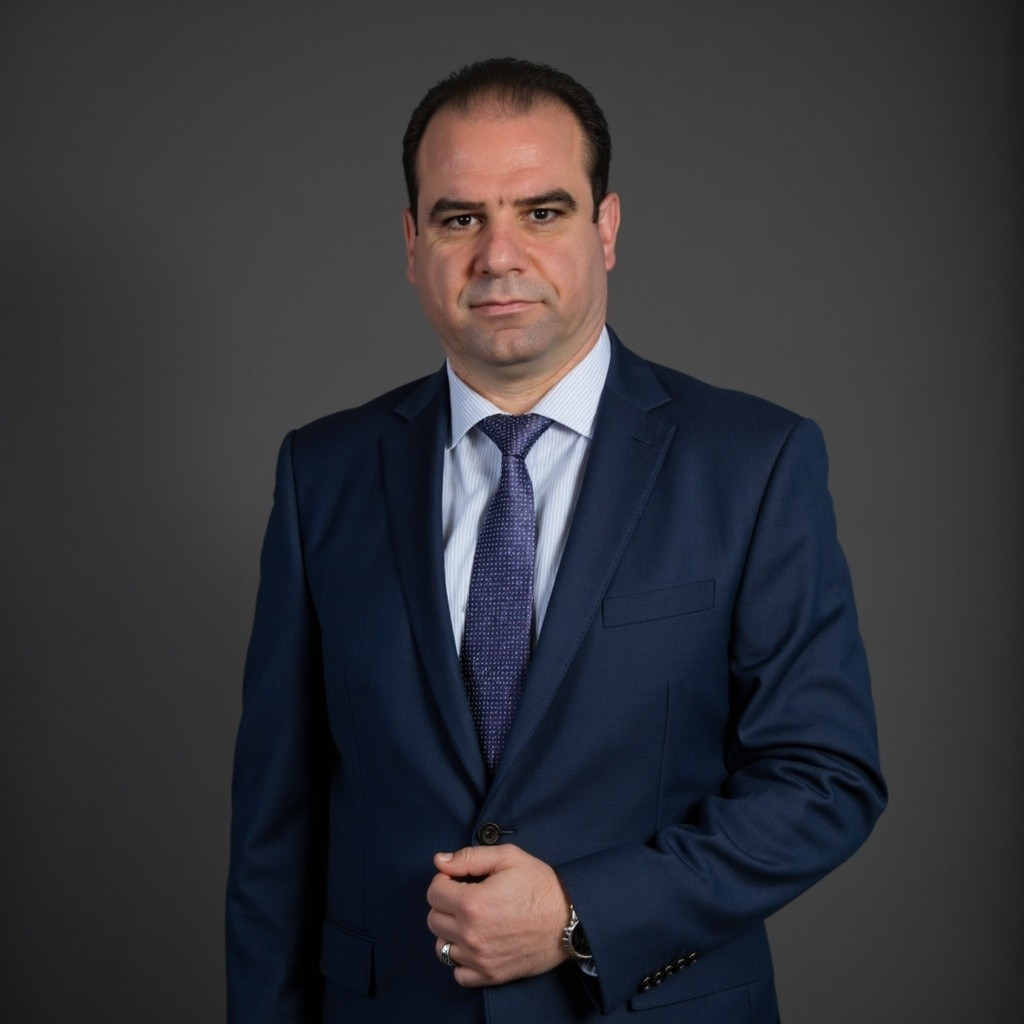
- Born: Hussam Jouhara
- Engineering career
- Discipline: Thermal engineering
- Institutions: Brunel University of London
- Employer: Brunel University London
- Awards: Fellow of Royal Academy of Engineering

Hussam Jouhara is a professor of thermal engineering and heat recovery systems at Brunel University of London. He specialises in heat pipe technology and thermal efficiency, and leads the university’s Heat Pipe and Thermal Management Research Group. He is also the founding editor-in-chief of the International Journal of Thermofluids and editor-in-chief of Thermal Science and Engineering Progress.

== Career ==
Jouhara obtained his Ph.D. in mechanical engineering from the University of Manchester in 2004. After several years researching at Trinity College Dublin, he joined Brunel University London as a lecturer. In 2011, he left academia to work for the manufacturer Econotherm Ltd, where he developed the manufacturing and design process of various types of heat pipe exchangers as a technical director. In 2014, Jouhara returned to Brunel where he became a senior lecturer and, in 2018, a professor.

Jouhara's research focuses on various thermal management technologies, with an emphasis on developing heat pipe systems. In industry, these heat pipe systems have improved primary energy savings of up to and over 40% in the production of metals, food, and ceramics by recovering waste heat. He has also used them to improve the sustainability of building design, the efficiency of food display cabinets and solar collectors, and the longevity of lithium-ion batteries for electric vehicles, as well as a variety of other applications.

Jouhara has also been involved in several Horizon Europe projects funded by the EU. These include coordinating the GEOFLEXheat project, which aims to improve how geothermal heat is harnessed for industrial applications; iWAYS, which aims to develop a set of technologies that recover water and energy from industrial waste streams; and ETEKINA, which successfully recovered over 40% of waste heat from factories in energy-intensive industries. Jouhara has expressed that his dream is to one day create a 'factory without chimneys' that does not emit toxic or polluting fumes.

== Awards ==
In recognition for his contributions to the field of engineering, Jouhara was elected as a fellow of the Royal Academy of Engineering in 2024. He is also a chartered engineer of the Institute of Mechanical Engineers and Engineers Ireland. In 2017, he received the inaugural Energy, Environment and Sustainability Group Prize from the Institution of Mechanical Engineers for his work developing efficient energy systems.

== Publications ==
Jouhara is an author of over 200 journal articles and books about thermal engineering, which have been cited over 14,200 times according to Google Scholar and over 10,300 times according to Scopus.

=== Journal articles ===
- Jouhara, H. et al. (2017). Municipal solid waste management and waste-to-energy in the context of a circular economy and energy recycling in Europe. Energy, Volume 141. https://doi.org/10.1016/j.energy.2017.11.128
- Jouhara, H. et al. (2017). Heat pipe-based systems: Advances and applications. Energy, Volume 128. https://doi.org/10.1016/j.energy.2017.04.028

=== Books ===
- Jouhara, H.; Trembley, J. (2025). “Biomedical and Clinical Cryogenics: Theory, Current Technology Advances, and Future Perspectives”'. Elsevier. ISBN 9780443301186
- Jouhara, H. (2022). Waste Heat Recovery in Process Industries. Wiley. ISBN 978-3-527-34856-5
- Tymkow, P.; Tassou, S.; Kolokotroni, M.; Jouhara, H. (2020). Building Services Design for Energy Efficient Buildings (2nd ed.). Routledge. ISBN 9780815365617
- Jouhara, H.; Reay, D.; McGlen, R.; Kew, P.; McDonough, J. (2023). Heat Pipes: Theory, Design and Applications (7th ed.). Elsevier. ISBN 978-0-12-823464-8
- Malinauskaite, J.; Jouhara, H. (2023). Sustainable Energy Technology, Business Models, and Policies: Theoretical Peripheries and Practical Implications. Elsevier. ISBN 978-0-443-18454-3

=== Patents ===
- Jouhara, H., (2023), “Thermal Transfer Loop”, Status: Filed. International Patent no. WO2019234423 (PCT/GB2019/051557). Granted.
- Jouhara, H., Lester, S. (2020), “Thermal Management System”, Status: Granted. International Patent no. WO2020016251 (PCT/EP2019/069161).
- Jouhara, H., Spencer, N. (2020), “Materials Recycling Apparatus”, Status: Filed. International Patent no. WO2018215767 (PCT/GB2018/051400).
- Jouhara, H., Spencer, N. (2017) , “Pyrolysis Chamber and Method of Disposal of Refuse”, Status: Filed. International Patent no. WO2017137716 (PCT/GB2017/050031).
- Jouhara, H., Lester, S. (2015), “Heat Transfer Apparatus”, Status: Granted. International Patent no WO2015193683 (PCT/GB2015/051796).
- Jouhara, H., Spencer, N. and Gibbon, M. (2015), “A pyrolysis chamber for treating domestic refuse and dwelling equipped with such a chamber”, Status: Published. International Patent no. WO/2015/104400 (PCT/EP2015/050369).
- Jouhara, H., Meskimmon, R. (2011), “A method and an apparatus for constructing a heat pipe”. Status: Granted. International Patent no. WO2011124890 (PCT/GB2011/000543).
