= Foreign Economic Relations Board of Turkey =

Turkish trade organization

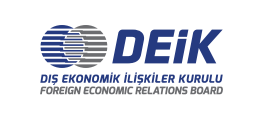
- Founded: 1986
- Purpose: International Business Diplomacy
- Headquarters: Istanbul
- Location: Seyrantepe, Huzur Mahallesi Azerbaycan Caddesi Skyland Sky Office No:4 Block B, Floor: 21 - 22, 34485 Sarıyer/İstanbul, Turkey
- President: Nail Olpak
- Website: deik.org.tr

The Foreign Economic Relations Board of Turkey (Turkish: Dış Ekonomik İlişkiler Kurulu), also known as DEİK, is a Turkish trade organization established in 1986 aimed at advancing business diplomacies and foreign economic policies of the Turkish private sector.

== Brief history ==
Although the body was established in 1986 through a collaboration of the Turkish state and the Turkish business community, the formation and establishment of DEİK could be traced to the first organized activity of the Turkish business community in 1965 with the formation of the Economic Development Foundation (in Turkish: İktisadi Kalkınma Vakfı - İKV) in collaboration with both Istanbul Chamber of Commerce (in Turkish: İstanbul Ticaret Odası - İTO) and the Istanbul Chamber of Industry (in Turkish: İstanbul Sanayi Odası - İSO). The maiden organization which metamorphosed into various bodies with different aims, objectives and interests amidst changes in legislations.

Despite the strict provisions of the 1982 constitutions on the activities of these interest groups, Turgut Özal, then Prime Minister and President coalesced with the Turkish business communities to put Turkey on the world economic map. During this time, the trio of Ministry of Foreign Affairs (Turkey), the State Planning Organization, and the Undersecretariat of Treasury and Foreign Trade were all responsible of the Turkey economic foreign policies with almost no role for actors on the private sector which in turn created loopholes against proper cooperation and actualization of foreign economic policies.

Özal’s restructuring of Turkey foreign policies resulted in the introduction of international bilateral councils for Turkish business communities and their foreign counterparts, hence the formation of Turkish-American Business Council in 1985 (which has since propagated to over a hundred and forty foreign bilateral business councils) and in November 1986, the Foreign Economic Relations Board of Turkey (Dış Ekonomik İlişkiler Kurulu - DEİK) was established.

DEİK was restructured in 2014, and charged with “conducting the foreign economic relations of the Turkish private sector”.

== Structure and leadership ==
The organizational arrangement consists of;

- General Assembly
- Board of directors
- Executive board
- Business councils
- Supervisory board
- Presidency council

Chambers and Commodity Exchanges of Turkey (TOBB), the Turkish Exporters’ Assembly (TİM), the Independent Industrialists’ and Businessmen’s Association (MÜSİAD), the International Investors Association, (YASED) and İKV (the Economic Development Foundation) all have their representatives who serve as members of the executive board.

List of other Presidents since establishment:

Tenure	Name
1986-1990	Alo Coşkun
1990-1991	Yalim Erez
1991-1992	Rona Yircali
1992-1996	Yalim Erez
1996-2001	Fuat Miras
2001-2014	M. Rifat Hisarciklioğu
2014-2017	Omer Cihad Vardan

The organization is currently presided over by Nail Olpak (born 1961). He is a mechanical engineering graduate of the Istanbul Technical University, He attended Yıldız Technical University for his postgraduate education. He doubles as the President of the organization and President of the Executive Board. He is a member of various organizational and business boards including leading Turkey telecommunication company, Turkcell.
