= Thermal engineering =

Subfield of mechanical engineering specializing in movement of heat energy

Thermal engineering, sometimes known as applied thermodynamics and heat transfer (ATHT), is a specialized sub-discipline of mechanical engineering that focuses on the storage, transfer, and conversion of heat energy within or between thermal systems. Thermal engineers must apply the laws of thermodynamics, fluid mechanics, and heat transfer to design useful systems that generally involve either heat engines or heat exchangers. Thermal engineering is an essential discipline in many modern industries ranging from power plants to aerospace to computer design.

== Physics ==
Thermal engineering often concerns itself with three subdisciplines of physics: thermodynamics, fluid mechanics, and heat transfer. Principles and concepts from these subdisciplines are often useful in the analysis of thermal systems.

=== Thermodynamics ===
Thermodynamics deals with the relationship between heat, work, and other properties among systems in equilibrium. It is the science of energy. There are four laws of thermodynamics.

- The zeroth law of thermodynamics states that if two bodies are in thermal equilibrium with a third body, then they are also in thermal equilibrium with each other.
- The first law of thermodynamics, also known as the law of conservation of energy, states that energy can neither be created nor destroyed. The only ways that the total energy in a closed system may change is through work or heat transfer.
- The second law of thermodynamics, addressing the limitations of the first, accounts for the quality and quantity of energy and dictates the flow of energy between systems. According to Clausius' statement, the second law of thermodynamics states that it is impossible for any system to act in such a way such that the sole result would be an energy transfer by heat from a cooler body to a hotter body. The Kelvin-Planck statement is also commonly cited for the second law. It states that it is impossible for a system that operates on a cycle to receive heat from a single reservoir and produce a net amount of work. Two statements imply the same result, and violating one would be violating the other.
- The third law of thermodynamics states that the entropy of a pure crystalline structure at absolute zero is zero. This law provides a reference point to calculate the absolute entropy of substances.

=== Fluid mechanics ===
Fluid mechanics can be divided into fluid statics, the study of various fluids at rest; and fluid dynamics, the study of the effect of forces on fluid motion. Common applications of fluid mechanics include plumbing systems for water, gas, and sewage in both households and cities, refrigerant flows and heat exchangers in refrigerators, transportation of fuel and other fluids in automobiles, etc.

=== Heat transfer ===
Heat transfer is one of the two forms of energy interactions in a closed system. Heat transfer refers to interactions where the driving force is the temperature difference within the system. Heat transfer occurs through one of the three following methods: conduction, convection, and radiation. Conduction occurs when heat transfers between two parts of the substance through physical contact, without the significant displacement of molecules making up the substance. Convection occurs when heat is transferred due to the mixing of fluids, which, in contrast to conduction, depends on the displacement of the molecules in the fluid. Lastly, radiation is heat transfer through space or matter not by conduction or convection.

== Applications ==
Engineers may utilize thermodynamic modelling to evaluate the thermodynamic properties and performance of a system they are designing.

=== Heat engines ===
Heat engines are systems that convert some portion of thermal energy into mechanical or electrical energy with the help of a working fluid. Their design relies on the fundamental concept of thermodynamic power cycles. Heat engines have theoretical and physical limitations on their energy conversion efficiency, known as thermal energy efficiency. While examples of heat engines exist in nature, in the context of thermal engineering they are man-made devices used to produce useful work. Depending on where fuel combustion takes place and where combustion products go, these man-made heat engines are divided into two categories: internal and external combustion engines.

The development of internal combustion engines is one of the specialized fields in which thermal engineers are involved. These have a variety of applications, but feature most prominently in the transportation industry as they are used everywhere from automobiles to jet engines.

One example of an external combustion engine is the steam turbine, a core component in power plants and also historically used in marine propulsion and locomotion.

=== Heat exchangers ===
A heat exchanger is a device that transfers heat between fluids that are at different temperatures, without the two fluids mixing. It is used for both heating and cooling applications. Some examples of heat exchangers include condensers and heat sinks.

Heat exchangers are often used for the purpose of heat regeneration or recovery, in which useful heating or cooling energy is collected and repurposed to improve the overall thermal efficiency of the entire heating or cooling process. Regenerative heat exchangers can be classified into recuperators and regenerators.

Heat exchangers are used in a variety of important everyday applications, such as HVAC and refrigeration, and are integral to cooling of computer infrastructure because effective heat dissipation is required to reduce thermal throttling in computers. Particularly within data centers, this helps maintain optimal performance and ensures that online systems can remain available and reliable.

=== Other applications ===
- Compressed-air systems
- Solar heating
- Thermal insulation
- Process fired heaters
- Thermal energy storage

== Research ==
Top academic journals in the field by h5-index as of April 2026 include Applied Thermal Engineering, International Journal of Heat and Mass Transfer, Case Studies in Thermal Engineering, Journal of Thermal Analysis and Calorimetry, and International Communications in Heat and Mass Transfer.

== See also ==
- History of thermodynamics
- Timeline of heat engine technology
- History of the internal combustion engine
- Internal combustion engine cooling
- Thermal conductance and resistance
- Heat pump and refrigeration cycle
- Vapor-compression refrigeration
- Gas-fired power plant
