= Blue Heritage Project =

Turkish nautical archaeology initiative

The Blue Heritage Project, previously known as the Turkish Shipwreck Inventory Project: Blue Heritage (TUBEP), is a Turkish initiative focusing on archaeological discoveries within its coastal waters. The goal is to survey, document, and protect its underwater cultural heritage, emphasizing shipwrecks and underwater artifacts.

== Background ==
Turkey is located in a strategic point between the Mediterranean and Aegean seas, historically an important center for sea trade routes. Over thousands of years its territorial waters have become home to many archaeological remains and shipwrecks. The Turkish government decided to record and preserve underwater sites using modern technology, by launching the Blue Heritage Project. The Blue Heritage Project is managed by two main institutions. SUDEMER at Dokuz Eylül University leads the research and fieldwork, while Turkey's Ministry of Culture and Tourism gives permission for the work and oversees the policies.

The project uses modern underwater archaeology methods, such as multibeam sonar to find objects on the sea floor, GIS technology to map and record sites, and Turkish-designed robotic vehicles to explore deep areas of the sea.

== Objectives ==
The project has several goals, the most important ones are:

- Build a detailed digital map (GIS) of underwater cultural heritage sites.
- Use sonar and other remote-sensing tools to survey Turkey's seas on a large scale.
- Send out locally made robotic submarines to find and study shipwrecks.
- Protect and preserve these sites for research and future cultural tourism.

== Notable discoveries ==
=== Roman Rhodes Shipwreck ===
In 2022 the Blue Heritage Project discovered and identified a Roman period shipwreck in the Gulf of Fethiye, dating to the late 3rd century AD. The ship had a cargo of amphorae originating from Rhodes.

=== 5th-century Plate Shipwreck ===
In 2024 another notable discovery was made, when the project discovered near the coast of Ayvalık in Balıkesir Province, what is considered as the largest “plate wreck” discovered in the Aegean and Mediterranean. The shipwreck was a 5th-century AD trade vessel with a cargo of about 10,000 ceramic plates, that were in an extraordinary preservation state.

== See also ==
- Maritime archaeology
- Convention on the Protection of the Underwater Cultural Heritage
