= NOAA Diving Manual =

Training and operations manual for scientific diving

- Cover of the 5th edition
- Language: English
- Subject: Scientific diving theory and operations
- Genre: Non-fiction
- Publisher: Best Publishing Company
- Publication date: 1977
- Publication place: US

The NOAA Diving Manual: Diving for Science and Technology is a book originally published by the US Department of Commerce for use as training and operational guidance for National Oceanographic and Atmospheric Administration divers. NOAA also publish a Diving Standards and Safety Manual (NDSSM), which describes the minimum safety standards for their diving operations. Several editions of the diving manual have been published, and several editors and authors have contributed over the years. The book is widely used as a reference work by professional and recreational divers.

== Overview ==
The book summarizes the state of the art for scientific diving, and provides detailed but accessible explanations of the physics and physiology of diving, diving equipment, and diving procedures, at a level appropriate for the diving scientist and scientific diving team supervisor.

== Content ==
The book is subdivided into sections and pages are numbered with reference to the section number. Sections of the second edition include:

- The physics of diving – Aspects of physics which affect the underwater diver
- Diving physiology – Influences of the underwater environment on the physiology of human divers
- Training of divers – Training divers who will be doing scientific work underwater
- Diving equipment – Equipment used to facilitate underwater diving
- Breathing media – Gas used for human respiration
- General diving and emergency procedures – Standard underwater diving protocols
- Working diving procedures – Work done underwater during diving operations
- Scientific diving procedures – Use of diving techniques in the pursuit of scientific knowledge
- Regional and special diving
- Air diving and decompression
- Mixed gas and oxygen diving
- Saturation diving – Diving mode and decompression technique
- Surface support platforms
- Manned underwater support platforms – Human habitable underwater enclosure filled with breathable gas
- Aquatic animals hazardous to divers
- Hyperbaric chambers – Hyperbaric pressure vessel for human occupation
- First Aid – Emergency first response medical treatment
- Accident management

The appendices include:

- References
- Selected bibliography
- NOAA Diving Regulations
- US Navy Standard Air Decompression Tables
- NOAA Nitrox I Diving and Decompression Tables
- US Navy Recompression Treatment Tables
- Nitrogen-Oxygen Saturation Treatment Table
- Index

== Reviews ==
The 4th edition was well received by Briscoe and Carmichael 2002 in Volume 15 of Oceanography

== Impact ==
Although subtitled as Diving for Science and Technology, the NOAA Diving Manual is considered a useful reference for all fields of underwater diving.

== Editions ==
The first edition was published by the US Department of Commerce in 1977.

The second edition was published by the US Department of Commerce in 1979 in hard and soft cover. The editor was James W. Miller.

The third edition was published in 1991.

The fourth edition was published by Best Publishing Company in 2001 in hardcover, softcover and searchable CD-ROM versions. The new material in the 4th edition includes the use of "oxygen-enriched air," commonly called Nitrox, which is widely used in both scientific and recreational diving to reduce the risk of decompression sickness.

The fifth edition was published in paperback by Best Publishing Company on June 10, 2013, with 875 pages. ISBN 978-1930536630

The sixth edition was published in paperback and as an e-book by Best Publishing Company on July 31, 2017, with 800 pages, ISBN 978-1930536883. New chapters in the 6th edition are: Advanced Platform Support – diving with ROVs/AUVs, submersibles, and atmospheric diving systems, and Underwater Photography and Videography. Other chapters were significantly revised: Diving Equipment, Procedures for Scientific Dives, Rebreathers, and Polluted-Water Diving. The editor was Greg McFall.
