= Applied Thermal Engineering =

- Discipline: Thermal engineering
- Language: English
- Edited by: C.N. Markides

Publication details
- Former names: Journal of Heat Recovery Systems, Heat Recovery Systems and CHP
- History: 1981–present
- Publisher: Elsevier
- Frequency: 18/year
- Impact factor: 6.6 (2024)

Standard abbreviations
- ISO 4: Appl. Therm. Eng.

Indexing
- CODEN: ATENFT
- ISSN: 1359-4311
- LCCN: 96648165
- OCLC no.: 33420600

Links
- Journal homepage; Online access; Online archive

Applied Thermal Engineering is a peer-reviewed scientific journal covering all aspects of the thermal engineering of advanced processes, including process integration, intensification, and development, together with the application of thermal equipment in conventional process plants, which includes its use for heat recovery. The editor-in-chief is C.N. Markides. The journal was established in 1981 as Journal of Heat Recovery Systems and renamed to Heat Recovery Systems and CHP in 1987. It obtained its current title in 1996.

According to the Journal Citation Reports, the journal has a 2021 impact factor of 6.9.
