= Turkish Exporters Assembly =

Turkish trade organization

Türkiye Exporters Assembly
- Founded: 1993
- Headquarters: Istanbul
- Location: Turkey
- Chairman of Board: Mustafa Gültepe
- General Secretary: Yiğit Tufan Eser
- Website: tim.org.tr

The Türkiye Exporters Assembly (Turkish: Türkiye İhracatçılar Meclisi), also known as TİM, is the umbrella organization for all Turkish export associations. TİM represents over 150 thousand exporters with 27 sectors and 61 Exporters Associations. The main objectives of the Türkiye Exporters Assembly are to coordinate and facilitate collaboration between exporters associations and to represent exporters at the highest level.

== Structure and leadership ==
TİM's organizational structure consists of a General Assembly, Board of Directors, Auditors and General Secretariat. The current chairman, Mustafa Gültepe is the leader of the organization after gaining 273 out of 273 votes at the 29th Ordinary General Assembly of the Türkiye Exporters Assembly. The Turkish president Recep Tayyip Erdoğan was also in attendance at the 2022 ordinary general assembly.
