= American Academy of Underwater Sciences =

American diving standards organisation

- American Academy of Underwater Sciences
- Abbreviation: AAUS
- Founded at: California
- Headquarters: Mobile, AL 36691-9067
- Region served: United States
- Services: Development of scientific diving standards and procedures, funding of research and internships.
- Fields: Scientific diving, underwater science.
- Members: 149 organizational members (2022)
- President: Jessica Keller
- Website: www.aaus.org

The American Academy of Underwater Sciences (AAUS) is a group of scientific organizations and individual members who conduct scientific and educational activities underwater. It was organized in 1977 and incorporated in the State of California in 1983.

== Purpose and activities ==
The mission of the AAUS is to facilitate the development of safe and productive scientific divers through education, research, advocacy, and the advancement of standards for scientific diving practices, certifications, and operations.

The AAUS administrates the AAUS Foundation, which is a 501c3 charity to provide internships and scholarships to students who study scientific diving or use scientific diving as a research tool.

== Scientific diving standards ==
The AAUS is responsible for the promulgation of the AAUS Standards for Scientific Diving Certification and Operation of Scientific Diving Programs. These are the consensual guidelines for scientific diving programs in the US, and are recognized by Occupational Safety and Health Administration as the "Standard" for scientific diving. These standards are followed by all AAUS Organizational Members allowing for reciprocity between institutions. Each institution is responsible for upholding the standards within its program and among its divers. The AAUS peer reviews the standards on a regular basis, so they represent the consensus of the scientific diving community and state-of-the-art technologies.

== Exemption from commercial diving regulations ==
In 1975 the United Brotherhood of Carpenters and Joiners of America petitioned for an emergency temporary standard be issued with respect to occupational diving operations. The ETS issued on June 15, 1976, was to be effective from July 15 but was challenged in the U.S. Court of Appeals by several diving contractors, and was withdrawn that November. A permanent standard for commercial diving became effective on 20 October 1977, but it did not consider the needs of scientific diving. The scientific diving community was unable to operate as previously, and in 1977 united to form the American Academy of Underwater Sciences (AAUS)

After the OHSA promulgated regulations for commercial diving in 1977, that adversely affected scientific diving programs, several SDP managers formed the California Advisory Committee on Scientific and Technical Diving (CACSTD), (Note: In this context, technical diving refers to occupational diving for the furthering of technological goals, not the mode of recreational diving which also uses this name) which produced a report on Scientific and Technical Diving, and later became the AAUS.

== Awards ==
- Conrad Limbaugh Memorial Award for Scientific Diving Leadership: Presented biennially to an individual who has made a significant contribution in diving safety and diving leadership on behalf of the scientific diving community. Open to any active member of the American Academy of Underwater Sciences. Nominated and voted upon by the AAUS general membership. Current BOD Members are not eligible during their term of office. Note: Beginning in 2016, this award is being offered every two years in rotation with the Scientific Diving Lifetime Achievement Award.
- Scientific Diving Lifetime Award: Presented biennially to a Scientific Diver in recognition of their significant impact to underwater science and research. Open to anyone in the scientific diving community. Nominations from the AAUS general membership. Voted and approved by the Past Presidents of AAUS and Past Award recipients. Current BOD Members are not eligible during their term of office. Note: Prior to 2017, this award was offered annually. As of 2017, this award is being offered every two years in rotation with the Conrad Limbaugh Memorial Award for Scientific Diving Leadership.
- AAUS Service Awards: AAUS Service Awards are presented to individuals who have made a significant contribution to the academy. Distinguished service awards are presented to an individual board member of the academy whom has provided outstanding service to AAUS and its mission. Awards are presented at the discretion of the board of directors. Current BOD Members are not eligible during their term of office.

== Library ==
Many of the AAUS publications were available online at the now defunct Rubicon Research Repository.
