= List of researchers in underwater diving =

This is a listing of researchers who have made discoveries or inventions relating to the science and technology of underwater diving. Divers who have become notable due to their exploits are not listed here, unless they have published research findings or invented an important item of diving related equipment. For these, see Outline of underwater divers.

== Researchers and inventors of diving technology ==
- Jerónimo de Ayanz y Beaumont – Spanish inventor (1553–1613)
- William Beebe – American ornithologist, marine biologist, entomologist, and explorer (1877–1962)
- Georges Beuchat – French inventor, diver and businessman (1910-1992)
- Joseph-Martin Cabirol – French engineer and designer of diving equipment (1799-1874)
- Alphonse and Théodore Carmagnolle – Inventors of an early atmospheric diving suit Atmospheric diving suit.
- John R. Clarke – American scientist and underwater breathing apparatus authority (1945- )
- Jacques-Yves Cousteau – French oceanographer and author (1910–1997) Co-inventor of the twin hose open circuit demand scuba regulator (AquaLung)
- Robert Davis (inventor) – English inventor and manufacturer of underwater breathing apparatus (1870–1965)
- Charles Anthony Deane – English diving engineer and inventor of a surface supplied diving helmet (1796-1848)
- John Deane (inventor) – Joint inventor of the diving helmet (1800-1884)
- Louis de Corlieu – French naval officer and inventor of the swimfin (1888-1967?)
- Auguste Denayrouze – French inventor of a demand air supply regulator for underwater diving (1837-1883)
- Ted Eldred – Australian inventor of the single hose diving regulator (1920-2005)
- Luigi Ferraro – Officer of the Royal Italian Navy and pioneer of Italian submarine warfare (1914-2006)
- Henry Fleuss – British inventor of diving equipment (1851 – 1933) (1851-1933) Early working rebreather
- Émile Gagnan – French engineer and co-inventor of the open circuit demand scuba regulator (1900-1979)
- Graham Hawkes – British marine engineer and designer of deep submersibles (1947- )
- Stig Insulan Dry suit buoyancy controls
- Peter Kreeft – American professor of philosophy (born 1937) Early diving suit
- Christian J. Lambertsen – American medical researcher (1917–2011) (1917-2011) Early oxygen rebreather (SCUBA)
- Yves Le Prieur – French naval officer and inventor of a free-flow scuba system (1885-1963)
- John Lethbridge – English wool merchant who invented a diving machine in 1715 (1675-1759) Diving suit
- William Hogarth Main – Cave diver and scuba configuration experimentalist "Hogarthian" rig
- Ernest William Moir – British civil engineer credited with inventing the first medical airlock (1862-1933)
- Phil Nuytten – Canadian deep-ocean explorer, scientist, and inventor of the Newtsuit (1941-2023)
- Joseph Salim Peress – Pioneering British diving engineer (1896-1978) Atmospheric diving suits
- Auguste Piccard – Swiss physicist, inventor, and explorer (1884-1962)
- Benoît Rouquayrol – French inventor of an early diving demand regulator
- Joe Savoie – Diver and inventor of diving helmets - Invented the neck dam for diving helmets (1926-1996)
- Willard Franklyn Searle – US Navy ocean engineer and developer of diving and salvage equipment and systems (1924-2009) Buoyancy compensator developments
- Gordon Smith (inventor) – Inventor of KISS diving rebreather, born 1950 (1950-2006)
- Augustus Siebe – British engineer mostly known for his contributions to diving equipment (1788-1872)
- Teseo Tesei – Italian naval officer and pioneering military diver (1909-1941)
- Jacques Triger – French geologist who invented the pressurised caisson (1801–1867) (1801-1867)

== Researchers in diving medicine and physiology, including decompression theory ==
=== B ===
- Arthur J. Bachrach – American psychologist and administrator (1923–2011)
- Costantino Balestra – Italian decompression researcher.
- R. Ball
- E. E. P. Barnard
- Bruce Edward Bassett (6 Jul 1935 – 4 May 2002) – USAF decompression researcher
- A. Baz
- Albert R. Behnke – US Navy physician and diving medicine researcher (1903-1992)
- Peter B. Bennett – English medical researcher (1931–2022) (12 June 1931 – 9 August 2022)
- Thomas E. Berghage
- Paul Bert – French zoologist, physiologist and politician (1833–1886) (1833-1886)
- Jef Biard
- Jean-Eric Blatteau –
- George F. Bond – US Navy physician and diving medicine and saturation diving researcher (1915-1983)
- M. Bontoux
- Jolie Bookspan – Decompression research.
- Arthur Edwin Boycott – British scientist (1877-1938)
- Robert Boyle – Anglo-Irish scientist (1627–1691) Relation between pressure and volume in a gas, and the effects of low ambient pressure on animals.
- Alf O. Brubakk – Norwegian decompression researcher (1941–2022) (24 January 1941 – 5 April 2022)
- Bucquoy, Eugène, (1837-1904), Hypothesis that blood gases form bubbles during decompression.
- Albert A. Bühlmann – Swiss physician and decompression researcher (1923–1994) Bühlmann decompression algorithm
- M. E. Burkard
- W. P. Butler

=== C ===
- J. Conkin
- M. D. Curley

=== D ===
- Guybon Chesney Castell Damant – English physiologist, diver, royal navy officer, and researcher
- B. G. D'Aoust – US Navy decompression researcher.
- Jefferson C. Davis (decompression researcher)
- Petar J. DeNoble – American decompression researcher.
- Kenneth William Donald – British expert on underwater and exercise physiology (1911–1994)
- David J. Doolette – American decompression researcher.
- Joel A. Dovenbarger – Decompression research.
- R. G. Dunford – Isobaric counterdiffusion.

=== E ===
- Carl Edmonds – Author of diving medicine textbooks
- David Hallen Elliott

=== F ===
- Yvon Fauvel
- William Paul Fife – US Air Force officer and hyperbaric medicine researcher (1917-2008)
- Edward T Flynn
- M. Frankenhaeuser Narcotic effects of oxygen at pressure.
- Valerie Flook – Saturation decompression and excursions from storage depth.

=== G ===
- Emmanuel Gempp
- Peter Germonpre
- Wayne A. Gerth (c2007) – American decompression researcher.
- Frederick Campbell Golding (4 June 1901 – 17 July 1984)
- Saul Goldman – Decompression researcher.
- Desmond F. Gorman (1988)
- D. J. Graves

=== H ===
- John Scott Haldane – British physiologist and researcher (1860–1936), Haldane's decompression model
- Robert William Hamilton Jr. – American physiologist (1930-2011)
- R. A. Hansen
- J. A. Hawkins
- Henry Valence Hempleman – British decompression researcher (1922-2006)
- Tom R. Hennessy (c1988) – British decompression researcher, combined perfusion/diffusion model of the BSAC'88 tables.
- Leonard Erskine Hill – British physiologist (1866–1952) (1866-1952)
- Brian Andrew Hills – Physiologist who worked on decompression theory (1934-2006), Thermodynamic model of decompression
- J. Himm
- D. C. Hoffman
- J. How
- Louis D. Homer
- Ernst Felix Immanuel Hoppe-Seyler – German physiologist and chemist (1825–1895)
- Karl E. Huggins – American decompression researcher – early dive computers (Orca Edge etc)
- J. Hugon

=== I ===
- J. Idicula
- Jean-Pierre Imbert – French decompression researcher.

=== K ===
- Edmond Kay
- F. J. Keays
- Derek J. Kidd, Canadian decompression researcher, Kidd–Stubbs decompression model, DCIEM decompression tables
- Eric P. Kindwall – Decompression sickness treatment researcher. Hyperbaric treatment schedules#Kindwall's monoplace table
- Joseph Kisslo – Research on PFO in divers
- Jacek Kot – Decompression researcher.

=== L ===
- Christian J. Lambertsen – American medical researcher (1917–2011) (1917-2011)
- Michael A. Lang – Environmental physiologist
- Edward H. Lanphier – American decompression researcher.
- G. Lauchner – Development of the DCIEM 1983 Decompression Model for Compressed Air Diving
- David Hugh LeMessurier – Australian decompression researcher.
- Gareth Lock – Diving safety, human factors in diving. (see Rebreather Forum 4, Human Factors in Diving conference 2021,)

=== M ===
- Alessandro Marroni – Hyperbaric medicine.
- Alfred Le Roy de Méricourt (13 October 1825 – 12 August 1901)
- Simon J. Mitchell – New Zealand physician and author on diving medicine (b1958)
- Charles Momsen – US Navy admiral, submarine rescue (1896–1967)
- Richard E. Moon – Hyperbaric medicine.

=== N ===
- T. S. Neuman – Diving medicine and physiology.
- Ronald Y. Nishi - Canadian decompression researcher

=== O ===
- Timothy R. O'Leary – RGBM decompression algorithm.

=== P ===
- Virginie Papadopolou – Decompression researcher
- D. Paris
- E. C. Parker
- W. D. M. Paton
- A. A. Pilmanis - Decompression researcher
- B. Pol
- Neal W. Pollock – Canadian researcher in diving physiology and hyperbaric medicine (1962 - )

=== Q ===
- J. A. Quinn (c1973)

=== R ===
- John Rawlins – Royal Navy officer and pioneer in the field of diving medicine (1922-2011)
- Jean-Yves Redureau

=== S ===
- V. Schrotter (c1906)
- A. Seireg
- Paul J. Sheffield
- Charles Wesley Shilling – U.S. Navy physician, researcher, and educator (1901-1994)
- Andrew Smith (physiologist) (fl.1873)
- Merrill P. Spencer
- George D. Stillson
- Roy A. Stubbs (c1984) Canadian decompression researcher, Kidd-Stubbs decompressin model, DCIEM decompression tables
- S. S. Survanshi
- H. Swanson

=== T ===
- Edward D. Thalmann – American hyperbaric medicine specialist (1945-2004) (1945-2004), Thalmann algorithm
- P. Tikuisis – Decompression researcher
- Jean-Noël Trucco – Decompression researcher, Table Marine National 90 (MN90).

=== U ===
- Donna M. Uguccioni (c1984) Diabetes and diving.

=== V ===
- Hugh D. Van Liew – Oxygen window
- Richard D. Vann – American academic and consultant at Divers Alert Network –
- James Vorosmarti Jr

=== W ===
- Dennis N. Walder
- T. J. Watelle – Early decompression research.
- Paul K. Weathersby
- James T. Webb
- R. S. Weaver
- D. West
- Bruce Wienke – Bubble model decompression researcher – American decompression researcher, Reduced gradient bubble model (RGBM)
- Robert D. Workman (physiologist) – American decompression researcher. Concept of M-values, US Navy (1965?) decompression tables.

=== Y ===
- O. D. Yarborough (c1937) – US Navy decompression researcher. 1937 US Navy tables, Treatment with hyperbaric oxygen.
- Donald E. Yount – American decompression researcher. Varying Permeability Model

=== Z ===
- Nathan Zuntz – German physiologist (1847–1920)

== See also ==
- Diving medicine – Diagnosis, treatment and prevention of disorders caused by underwater diving
- History of decompression research and development
- Human physiology of underwater diving – Influences of the underwater environment on the physiology of human divers
