= Pyle stop =

Type of short deep decompression stops in addition to the standard profile

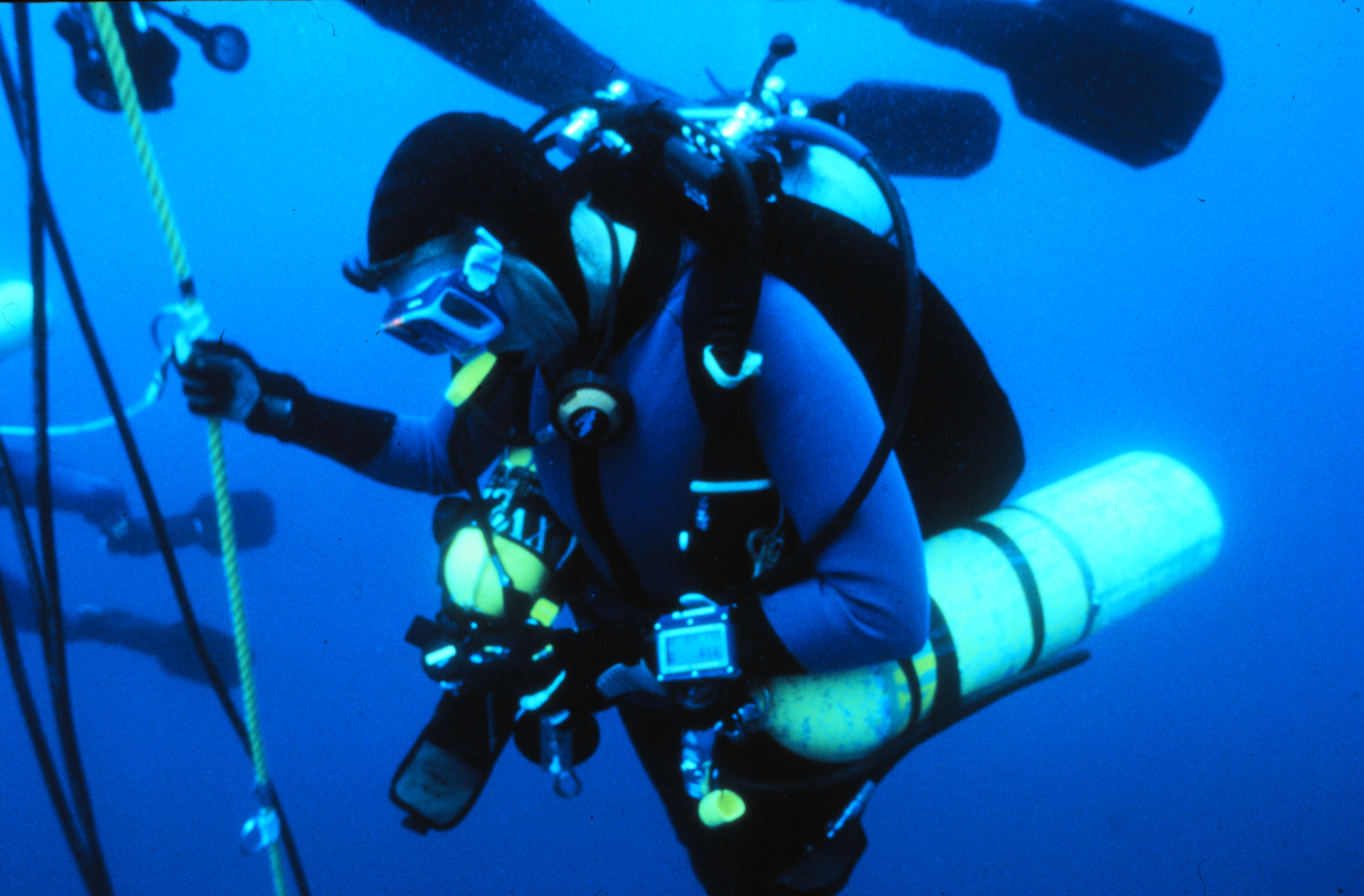
Technical diver decompressing after a mixed gas dive to 60m

A Pyle stop is a type of short, optional deep decompression stop performed by scuba divers at depths well below the first decompression stop mandated by a conventional dissolved phase decompression algorithm, such as the US Navy or Bühlmann decompression algorithms. They were named after Richard Pyle, an American ichthyologist from Hawaii, who found that they prevented his post-dive fatigue symptoms after deep dives to collect fish specimens.

The ascent pattern has become known as Pyle stops, or "deep stops" since the late 1990s.

These stops were developed by Pyle based on personal experience, and have had a significant influence on decompression theory and practice in the following years.

== Origins ==
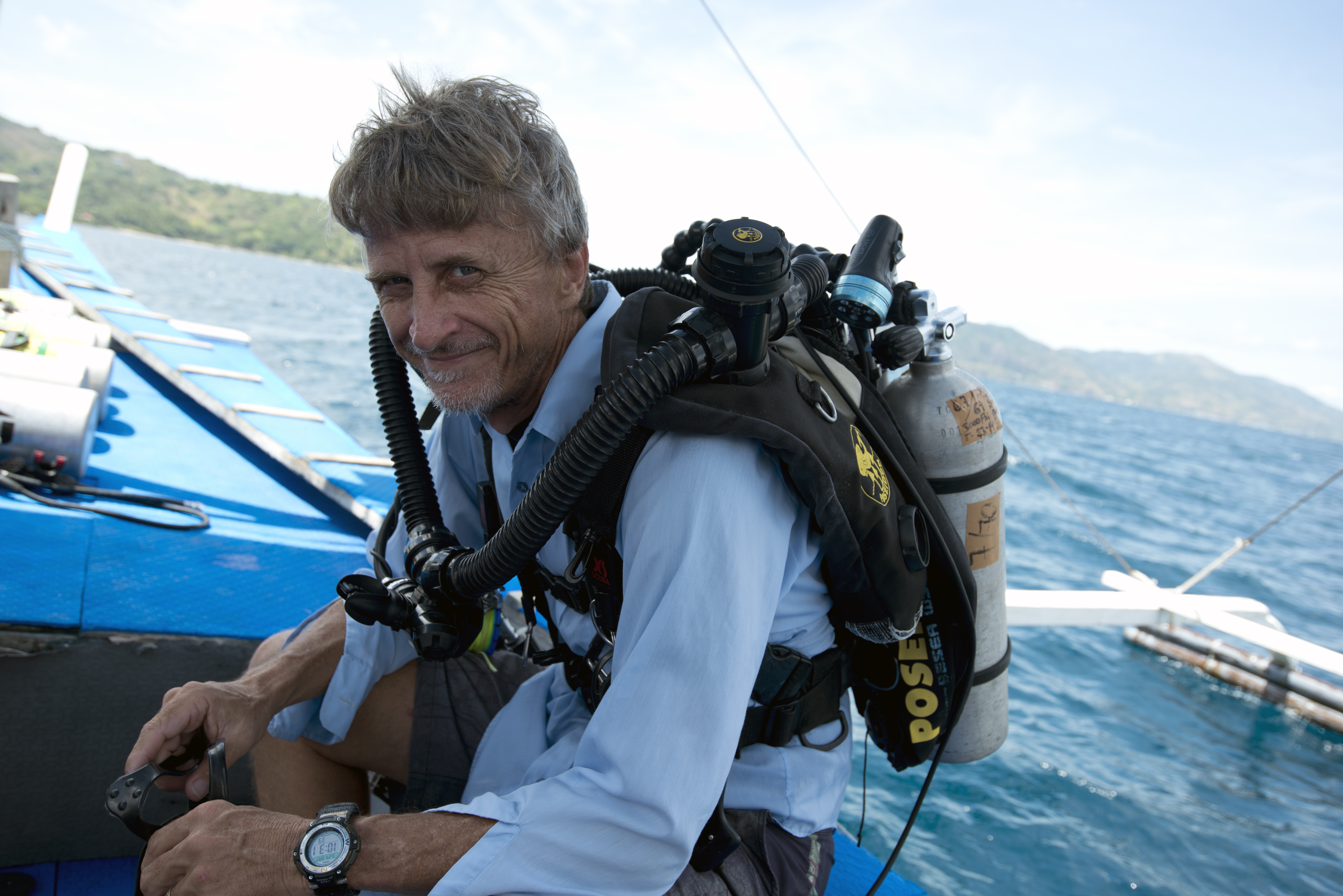
Richard L. Pyle On Boat in Philippines, with Poseidon SE7EN Rebreather. The photo was taken during a joint expedition with Bishop Museum and the California Academy of Sciences to survey Mesophotic Coral Ecosystems, May 2014.

Richard Pyle is the original user of what has become known as "Pyle Stops"

In the 1980s Pyle had been diving to explore depths between 180 and 220 feet (50 and 70 m) in search of fish to collect, a depth range often called the "twilight zone". He noticed that some dive patterns did not make him feel any post-dive fatigue. Reviewing his dive profiles, Pyle found his that post-dive fatigue symptoms were almost absent when he performed some "deep stops" before his mandatory decompression stops.

After many dives, Pyle correlated the post-dive malaise to those dives when, having caught no fish, he ascended directly to the first mandatory decompression stop. On the dives where he collected fish and interrupted his ascent to vent their swim bladders well before the first decompression stop, he did not exhibit fatigue symptoms on the surface. He then instituted a system of making brief deeper stops at a pressure half-way between the previous stop (or the dive's maximum depth initially) and the first stop mandated by his decompression schedule.

Pyle received some theoretical justification for his findings when he found in 1989 that his pattern of ascent was similar to that produced by David Yount's Varying Permeability Model (VPM) of decompression calculation. The ascent pattern became known as "Pyle's stops" or "Deep stops".

== Calculation of Pyle stops ==
Example dive profile of 60m dive on air, with oxygen decompression at 6m, and Pyle stops.

Richard Pyle's method for incorporating deep safety stops is:

1. A decompression profile is calculated for the planned dive, using conventional decompression software (without deep stops).
2. The first stop is midway between the depth at the start of ascent and the depth of the first decompression stop required by the program. The stop would be about 2–3 minutes long.
3. The decompression profile is re-calculated including the deep safety stop in the profile (most software will allow for multi-level profile calculations).
4. If the distance between the first deep safety stop and the first "required" stop is greater than 30 feet (9 m), then a second deep safety stop is added halfway between the first deep safety stop and the first required stop.
5. This procedure is repeated until there is less than 30 feet between the last deep safety stop and the first required decompression stop.

The depth midway between the depth at start of ascent and first decompression stop depth (the average of the two depths) is half the sum of the two depths.

For example:

Bottom depth is 60 m and the first required decompression stop depth is 15 m,
Average of these depths is (60 m + 15 m) ÷ 2 = 37.5 m, which may be rounded to 38 m. This would be the depth for the first Pyle Stop.
The difference between first Pyle stop and first required stop is 38 m - 15 m = 23 m
This is more than 9 m, so another Pyle stop is indicated.
Average of 38 m and 15 m is (38 m + 15 m) ÷ 2 = 26.5 m, which may be rounded to 27 m. This would be the depth of the second Pyle stop.
The difference between second Pyle stop and first required stop is 27 m - 15 m = 12 m
This is more than 9 m, so a third Pyle stop is indicated.
Average of 27 m and 15 m is (27 m + 15 m) ÷ 2 = 21 m, This would be the depth of the third Pyle stop.
The difference between third Pyle stop and first required stop is 21 m - 15 m = 6 m
This is less than 9 m, so no more Pyle stops are indicated.

== Advantages, disadvantages and expert opinions on deep stops ==
Opinions on the efficacy and safety of Pyle stops is varied, as are opinions on whether they should be practiced by recreational divers, technical divers and professional divers. Some of these opinions are based on theoretical considerations, and others are supported by some systematic experimental evidence.

A theoretical disadvantage of Pyle stops and some other deep stops is that they are done at a depth where some tissues are still in-gassing, and this will increase the gas concentration in those tissue compartments, requiring additional decompression time for the same decompression risk, and hence they should be used only by professional divers. No-decompression dive profiles are not shown to be safer when a deep stop is added, and in particular a deep stop should not be added at the expense of reducing the shallower stop times on a decompression dive.

On the other hand, adding a deep stop while following the computer mandated shallower stops has not been shown to be harmful. Deep Stops are performed for 2–3 minutes, at depths where any extra nitrogen loading is likely to be small compared to the total gas load. During short deep dives it is the fast tissues that load up and may saturate with inert gas. The deep stop could reduce the saturation of those fast tissues, while the slower tissues are still in-gassing by a small amount. Some experimental work has shown reduced venous bubble counts after deep stops combined with the computed shallow stops in comparison with the shallow stops alone.

US Navy experimental research at NEDU indicated that lengthy deep stops as calculated by RGBM created more supersaturation and would result in more incidence of DCS than a Haldanean schedule of the same duration. This result did not relate to Pyle stops of just a couple of minutes at each stop, which were considered only as better control of the ascent rate.

In the UK, the Sub-Aqua Association has adopted a system of deep stops as an integral part of its training program.

== Developments on Pyle stops and other deep stops ==
Historical context:

- The thermodynamic model (Hills, 1976) assumes that gas phase (bubbles) separates in supersaturated tissue.
- The varying permeability model (Yount, 1986) assumes preexisting bubble nuclei permeate blood and tissue, and grow during decompression.
- The reduced gradient bubble model (Wienke, 1990) abandons gel parameterization of the varying permeability model, and extends the bubble model to repetitive, altitude, and reverse profile diving.
- The tissue bubble diffusion model (Gernhardt and Vann, 1990) assumes gas transfer across bubble interface, and correlates growth with DCI statistics.

=== Bubble theories ===
The Varying Permeability Model (or Variable Permeability Model or VPM) is a decompression algorithm developed by David E. Yount and others for use in professional diving and recreational diving. It was developed to model laboratory observations of bubble formation and growth in both inanimate and in vivo systems exposed to pressure.

The VPM presumes that microscopic bubble nuclei always exist in water and tissues that contain water. Any nuclei larger than a specific "critical" size, which is related to the maximum dive depth (exposure pressure), will grow during ascent. The VPM aims to keep an acceptably low risk of symptoms of decompression sickness developing by keeping the total volume of these growing bubbles below a critical volume. The method used is to limit supersaturation by keeping the external pressure relatively high during decompression. This approach produces first decompression stops significantly deeper than those associated with Haldanean (dissolved phase) models, and comparable with Pyle stops.

=== Gradient factors ===
Gradient factors are a way to induce deeper stops in a dissolved state (Haldanian) decompression model. The M-values are modified to reduce the maximum allowed supersaturation in the tissue compartments by a linearly varying factor proportional to depth. They are expressed as two percentages, one being the percentage of nominal M-value at the surface, and the other being percentage of the nominal M-value at depth. Selecting a low gradient factor at depth causes the algorithm to require the first stop at a deeper depth than the unmodified algorithm. All tissue compartments are affected in the same way. Provided both gradient factors are less than 100%, the decompression schedule generated by gradient factors will be more conservative than the unmodified algorithm.

=== Profile determined intermediate stops ===
PDISs are intermediate stops at a depth above the depth at which the leading compartment for the decompression calculation switches from ongassing to offgassing and below the depth of the first obligatory decompression stop, (or the surface, on a no-decompression dive). The ambient pressure at that depth is low enough to ensure that the tissues are mostly off-gassing inert gas, although under a very small pressure gradient. This combination is expected to inhibit bubble growth. The leading compartment is generally not the fastest compartment except in very short dives, for which this model does not require an intermediate stop. For decompression dives, the existing obligation is not increased during the PDI stop.

== See also ==
- Decompression (diving) – Pressure reduction and its effects during ascent from depth
- Reduced gradient bubble model – Decompression algorithm
- Bühlmann decompression algorithm – Mathematical model of tissue inert gas uptake and release with pressure change
- Decompression theory: Gradient factors – Theoretical modelling of decompression physiology
