= Thermodynamic model of decompression =

Early diving decompression model

Decompression profiles based on the Thermodynamic model compared with the US Navy table for the same depth and bottom time

The thermodynamic model was one of the first decompression models in which decompression is controlled by the volume of gas bubbles coming out of solution. In this model, pain only DCS is modelled by a single tissue which is diffusion-limited for gas uptake and bubble-formation during decompression causes "phase equilibration" of partial pressures between dissolved and free gases. The driving mechanism for gas elimination in this tissue is inherent unsaturation, also called partial pressure vacancy or the oxygen window, where oxygen metabolised is replaced by more soluble carbon dioxide. This model was used to explain the effectiveness of the Torres Straits Island pearl divers empirically developed decompression schedules, which used deeper decompression stops and less overall decompression time than the current naval decompression schedules. This trend to deeper decompression stops has become a feature of more recent decompression models.

== Concept ==
Brian A. Hills analysed the existing decompression hypotheses frequently referenced in the literature of the time, and identified three basic characteristics of comprehensive theoretical approaches to modeling decompression:

1. The number and composition of tissues involved;
2. A mechanism and controlling parameters for onset of identifiable symptoms;
3. A mathematical model for gas transport and distribution.

Hills found no evidence of discontinuity in the incidence of decompression symptoms for exposure/depth variations, which he interpreted as suggesting that either a single critical tissue or a continuous range of tissues are involved, and that correlation was not improved by assuming an infinite range of half times in a conventional exponential model. After later experimental work he concluded that the imminence of decompression sickness is more likely to be indicated by the quantity of gas separating from solution (the critical volume hypothesis) than its mere presence (as determined by a critical limit to supersaturation) and suggested that this implies that conventional (Haldanian) schedules are actually treating an asymptomatic gas phase in the tissues and not preventing the separation of gas from solution.

Efficient decompression will minimize the total ascent time while limiting the total accumulation of bubbles to an acceptable non-symptomatic critical value. The physics and physiology of bubble growth and elimination indicate that it is more efficient to eliminate bubbles while they are very small. Models which include bubble phase have produced decompression profiles with slower ascents and deeper initial decompression stops as a way of curtailing bubble growth and facilitating early elimination, in comparison with the models which consider only dissolved phase gas.

According to the thermodynamic model, the condition of optimum driving force for outgassing is satisfied when the ambient pressure is just sufficient to prevent phase separation (bubble formation). The fundamental difference of this approach is equating absolute ambient pressure with the total of the partial gas tensions in the tissue for each gas after decompression as the limiting point beyond which bubble formation is expected.

The model assumes that the natural unsaturation in the tissues due to metabolic reduction in oxygen partial pressure provides the buffer against bubble formation, and that the tissue may be safely decompressed provided that the reduction in ambient pressure does not exceed this unsaturation value. Clearly any method which increases the unsaturation would allow faster decompression, as the concentration gradient would be greater without risk of bubble formation.

The natural unsaturation, an effect variously known as the oxygen window, partial pressure vacancy and inherent unsaturation, increases with depth, so a larger ambient pressure differential is possible at greater depth, and reduces as the diver surfaces. This model leads to slower ascent rates and deeper first stops, but shorter shallow stops, as there is less bubble phase gas to be eliminated.

Natural unsaturation also increases with increase in partial pressure of oxygen in the breathing gas.

The thermodynamic model is based on the following assumptions:

- Only one type of tissue is considered, which is the first type to present symptoms of decompression sickness. Other, non-symptomatic, tissues are disregarded as they do not present a problem.
- The formation of bubble nuclei occurs randomly within the tissues, and at various levels of supersaturation.
- Once a bubble nucleus has formed within a supersaturated tissue, dissolved gas in the tissue will diffuse through the bubble surface until equilibrium is reached between pressure in the bubble and concentration in the adjacent tissue.
- Phase equilibration occurs within a few minutes.
- Once bubbles have formed they have a tendency to coalesce, causing pressure on the tissues and nerves, which will eventually cause pain.
- Once bubbles have formed, they are only eliminated by diffusion due to inherent unsaturation.

The requirement to maintain an ambient pressure high enough to prevent bubble growth leads to a significantly deeper first stop than the dissolved phase models which assume that bubbles do not form during asymptomatic decompression.

This model was a radical change from the traditional dissolved phase models. Hills was met with considerable skepticism and after several years of advocating two-phase models, eventually turned to other fields of research. Eventually, the work of other researchers provided enough impact to gain widespread acceptance for bubble models, and the value of Hills' research was recognised.

== Further development ==
The bubble models of decompression are a logical development from this model. The critical-volume criterion assumes that whenever the total volume of gas phase accumulated in the tissues exceeds a critical value, signs or symptoms of DCS will appear. This assumption is supported by doppler bubble detection surveys. The consequences of this approach depend strongly on the bubble formation and growth model used, primarily whether bubble formation is practicably avoidable during decompression.

This approach is used in decompression models which assume that during practical decompression profiles, there will be growth of stable microscopic bubble nuclei which always exist in aqueous media, including living tissues.

=== Varying Permeability Model ===
The Varying Permeability Model (VPM) is a decompression algorithm developed by D.E. Yount and others for use in professional and recreational diving. It was developed to model laboratory observations of bubble formation and growth in both inanimate and in vivo systems exposed to pressure. The VPM presumes that microscopic bubble nuclei always exist in water and tissues that contain water. Any nuclei larger than a specific "critical" size, which is related to the maximum dive depth will grow during decompression. The VPM aims to minimize the total volume of these growing bubbles by keeping the external pressure relatively large, and the inspired inert gas partial pressures low during decompression.

=== Reduced Gradient Bubble Model ===
The reduced gradient bubble model (RGBM) is a decompression algorithm developed by Dr Bruce Wienke. It is related to the Varying Permeability Model. but is conceptually different in that it rejects the gel-bubble model of the varying permeability model.

It is used in several dive computers, particularly those made by Suunto, Aqwary, Mares, HydroSpace Engineering, and Underwater Technologies Center. It is characterised by the following assumptions: blood flow (perfusion) provides a limit for tissue gas penetration by diffusion; an exponential distribution of sizes of bubble seeds is always present, with many more small seeds than large ones; bubbles are permeable to gas transfer across surface boundaries under all pressures; the haldanean tissue compartments range in half time from 1 to 720 minutes, depending on gas mixture.
