= Henry Valence Hempleman =

British decompression researcher

Henry Valence "Val" Hempleman (25 March 1922 - 14 July 2006) was a researcher in the field of diving decompression.

== Early life ==
Val Hempleman was the son of Harry Hempleman, a sea captain on the UK-New Zealand route. He was born in at Neasham, Darlington and moved to Hull as a boy. He won a scholarship to Hymers College, Hull, followed by St Catharine's College, Cambridge, where he studied inorganic chemistry and physics. This was interrupted by the Second World War, and he was called up to the Royal Navy and became a research assistant at the physiological laboratory Vernon II at HMS Dolphin in Gosport, where he was involved in experimental work assessing the effects of explosions on immersed personnel. After the war he continued his studies, and received an honours degree in chemistry. In 1946 he was employed at the Wellcome Physiological Research Laboratory in Beckham, Kent, where he worked on chemotherapeutic agents for the treatment of pertussis infections.

== Career ==
In 1949 he rejoined Vernon II, which had become the Royal Naval Physiological Laboratory, as a scientific officer, and was soon involved in the development of decompression tables. In 1952 he published a paper on decompression procedures and the calculation of decompression schedules. Further work involved decompression from greater depths to develop the Royal Navy's capacity for rescue from disabled submarines.

In 1960 he started work on decompression for compressed air workers, applicable to caisson and tunneling operations, and in 1966 published the Blackpool Decompression Tables, which became an internationally accepted industry standard. He was appointed superintendent of the RNPL in 1968 and soon thereafter was awarded his PhD for research into prevention of decompression sickness. Experimental work in the use of helium based breathing gases resulted in a record breaking chamber dive in 1970 by associated researchers to 1,535 feet (468 m), followed in 1980 by a simulated depth of 2,165 feet (660 m) at the same facility.

In 1972 the RNPL published decompression tables based on Hempleman's tissue slab diffusion model.

The critical volume concept was developed by T. R. Hennessy and Hempleman who formulated a simple mathematical condition linking the dissolved gas and the safe ascent pressure:

P_{tissue} ≤ a×P_{ambient} + b

Where P_{tissue} represents the dissolved gas tension, P_{ambient}, the ambient pressure and two coefficients, a and b. This linear relationship between dissolved gas and ambient pressure has the same mathematical form as an M-value, which suggests that all the dissolved state models using M-values (including the US Navy tables previous to those based on the Exponential–Linear model, the Bühlmann tables and all the French Navy tables), may be considered expressions of the critical volume criterion, though their authors may have argued for other interpretations. He retired in 1982.

Between 1974 and 1976 Hempleman was involved in the tests of the "Jim", atmospheric diving suit to depths of up to 1,500 ft.

== Personal life ==
In 1951, Val Hempleman married Barbara Smith, a co-worker at RNPL, who survived him with their two sons.

== Awards ==
- 1976: Albert R Behnke Jr. Award of the Undersea Medical Society
- 1977: Queen Elizabeth II Silver Jubilee Medal
- 1982: Imperial Service Order

== Publications ==
- Eaton, W.J.; Hempleman, H.V. (1962). The incidence of bends in goats, after direct surfacing from raised pressures of air. Rep. 209. (Report). London: Medical Research Council, R.N. Personnel Research Committee, Underwater Physiology Sub-Committee.
- Golding, F. Campbell; Griffiths, P.; Hempleman, H.V.; Paton, W.D.M.; Walder, D.N. (July 1960). "Decompression sickness during construction of the Dartford Tunnel". British Journal of Industrial Medicine. 17 (3): 167–80. doi:10.1136/oem.17.3.167. PMC 1038052. PMID 13850667.
- Hempleman, H.V. (1952). Investigation into the decompression tables. A new theoretical basis for the calculation of decompression tables. Rep. I II, Pt. A. (Report). London: Medical Research Council, R.N. Personnel Research Committee, Underwater Physiology Sub-Committee.
- Hempleman, H.V. (1957). Investigation into the decompression tables. Further basic facts on decompression sickness. Rep. 168 (Report). London: Medical Research Council, R.N. Personnel Research Committee. Underwater Physiology Sub-Committee.
- Hempleman, H.V. (1963). Lambertsen, C.J.; Greenbaum, L.J. (eds.). Tissue inert gas exchange and decompression sickness. Proceedings of the Second Symposium on Underwater Physiology (Report). Washington, DC: Natl. Acad. Sci./Natl. Res. Council.
- Hempleman, H.V. (1984). "Decompression Theory.". In Shilling, C.W.; Carlston, C.B.; Mathias, R.A. (eds.). The Physician's Guide to Diving Medicine. Boston, MA.: Springer. doi:10.1007/978-1-4613-2671-7_4. ISBN 978-1-4612-9663-8.
- Hennessy, T.R.; Hempleman, H.V. (1977). "An examination of the critical released gas volume concept in decompression sickness". Proceedings of the Royal Society of London. Series B. 197 (1128): 299–313. Bibcode:1977RSPSB.197..299H. doi:10.1098/rspb.1977.0072. PMID 19749. S2CID 6692808.
- Hempleman, H.V. (1969). "British decompression theory and practice". In Bennett, P.B.; Elliot, D.H. (eds.). The Physiology and Medicine of Diving and Compressed Air Work. Baltimore: Williams and Wilkins. pp. 291–318.
- Hempleman, H.V. (1957). Further Basic Facts On Decompression Sickness. Investigation Into The Decompression Tables, UPS 168 (Report). London, UK: Medical Research Council.
- Hennessy, T.R.; Hempleman, H.V. (1977). "An Examination Of The Critical Released Gas Concept In Decompression Sickness". Proc. R. Soc. Lond. B. 197: 299–313.
