= Haldane's decompression model =

Decompression model developed by John Scott Haldane

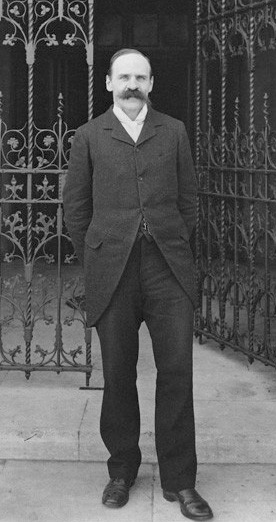
John Scott Haldane in 1902

Decompression table-I in ft and psi. "Stoppages during the ascent of a diver after ordinary limits of time from surface."

Decompression table-II in ft and psi. "Stoppages during the ascent of a diver after delay beyond the ordinary limits of time from surface."

Haldane's Decompression Tables I and II

Haldane's decompression model is a mathematical model for decompression to sea level atmospheric pressure of divers breathing compressed air at ambient pressure that was proposed in 1908 by the Scottish physiologist, John Scott Haldane (2 May 1860 – 14/15 March 1936), who was also famous for intrepid self-experimentation.

Haldane prepared the first recognized decompression table for the British Admiralty in 1908 based on extensive experiments on goats and other animals using a clinical endpoint of symptomatic decompression sickness. The model, commented as "a lasting contribution to the diving world", was published in the Journal of Hygiene.

Haldane observed that goats, saturated to depths of 165 feet (50 m) of sea water, did not develop decompression sickness (DCS) if subsequent decompression was limited to half the ambient pressure. Haldane constructed schedules which limited the critical supersaturation ratio to "2", in five hypothetical body tissue compartments characterized by their halftime. Halftime is also termed Half-life when linked to exponential processes such as radioactive decay. Haldane's five compartments (halftimes: 5, 10, 20, 40, 75 minutes) were used in decompression calculations and staged decompression procedures for fifty years.

Previous theories to Haldane worked on "uniform compression", as Paul Bert pointed in 1878 that very slow decompression could avoid the caisson disease, then Hermann von Schrötter proposed in 1895 the safe "uniform decompression" rate to be of "one atmosphere per 20 minutes". Haldane in 1907 worked on "staged decompression" – decompression using a specified relatively rapid ascent rate, interrupted by specified periods at constant depth – and proved it to be safer than "uniform decompression" at the rates then in use, and produced his decompression tables on that basis.

== Previous work ==
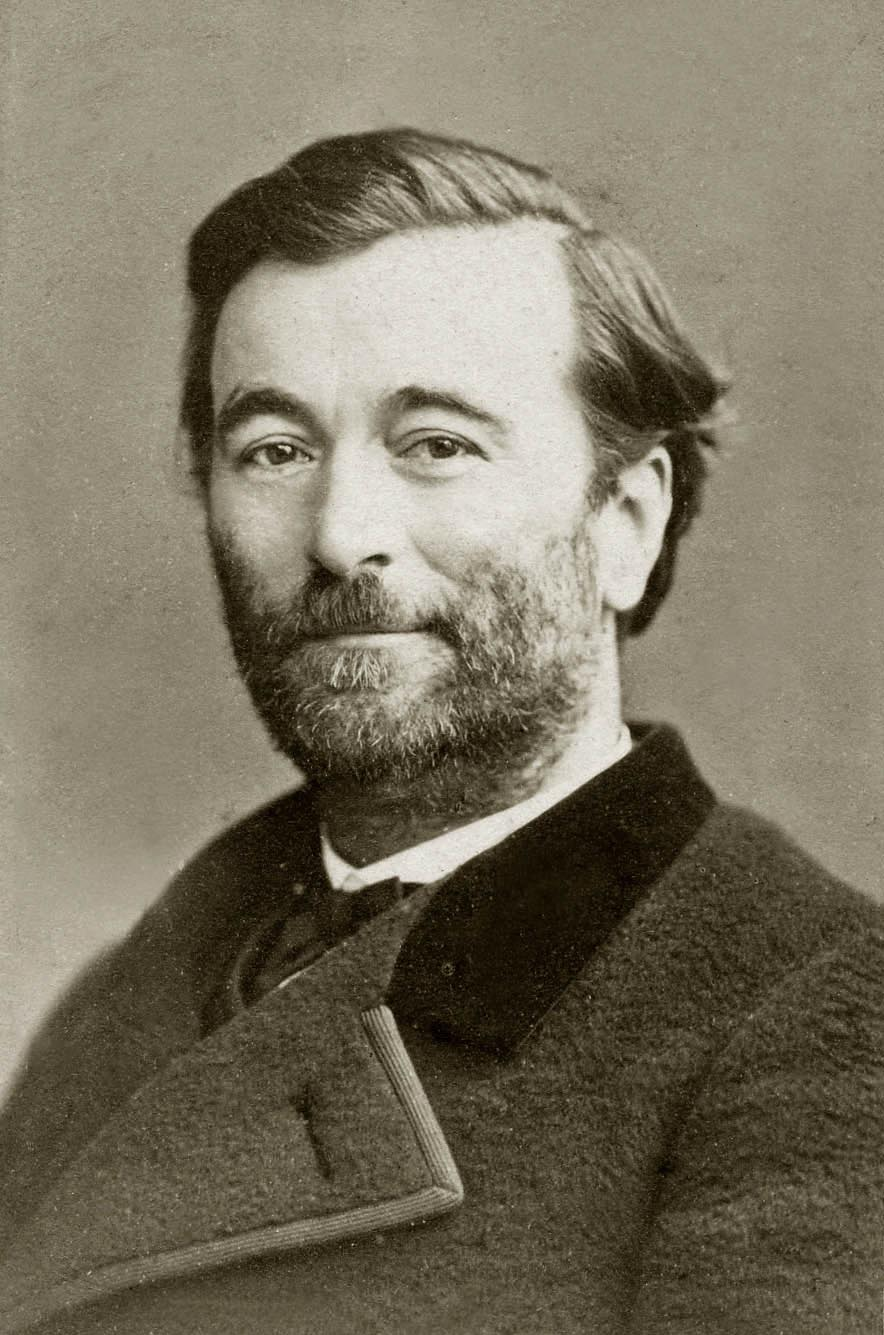
Paul Bert.

Previous work to John Scott Haldane

=== Paul Bert ===
Paul Bert (17 October 1833 – 11 November 1886) was a French physiologist who graduated at Paris as doctor of medicine in 1863, and doctor of science in 1866. He was appointed professor of physiology successively at Bordeaux (1866) and the Sorbonne (1869). Paul Bert was given the nickname of "Father of Aviation Medicine" after his work, La Pression barometrique (1878), a comprehensive investigation on the physiological effects of air-pressure, which pointed out that the symptoms of caisson disease could be avoided by means of very slow decompression. However, his work did not furnish data about safe decompression rates.

=== Schrötter ===
Anton Hermann Victor Thomas Schrötter (5 August 1870 – 6 January 1928), an Austrian physiologist and physician who was a native of Vienna, was a pioneer of aviation and hyperbaric medicine, and made important contributions in the study of decompression sickness. He studied medicine and natural sciences at the Universities of Vienna and Strasbourg, earning his medical degree in 1894, and during the following year receiving his doctorate of philosophy. He was active in many fields of medicine and physiology. His first interest from 1895 was the investigation and combating of caisson disease, and during his tenure in Nussdorf he studied the numerous diseases that have occurred and was looking for ways of treatment and prevention.

His published report in 1900 with Dr. Richard Heller and Dr. Wilhelm Mager, on air pressure disease is considered the basic German-language work of diving and hyperbaric medicine. Schrötter, Heller and Mager framed rules for safe decompression and believed that the decompression rate of one atmosphere (atm) per 20 minutes would be safe. Leonard Erskine Hill and Greenwood decompressed themselves without serious symptoms after exposure to 6 atm (610 kPa).

== Haldane's work ==
The Admiralty Committee needed to frame definite rules for safe decompression in the shortest possible time for deep diving, and hence, Haldane was commissioned in 1905 by the UK Royal Navy for this purpose, to design decompression tables for divers ascending from deep water.

In 1907 Haldane made a decompression chamber to help make deep-sea divers safer and produced the first decompression tables after extensive experiments with animals. In 1908 Haldane published the first recognized decompression table for the British Admiralty. His tables remained in use by the Royal Navy till 1955.

"The Prevention of Compressed Air Illness" was published in 1908 by Haldane, Boycott and Damant recommending staged decompression. These tables were accepted for use by the Royal Navy.

Haldane introduced the concept of half-times to model the uptake and release of nitrogen into the blood in different body tissues, and suggested five body tissue compartments with half times of 5, 10, 20, 40 and 75 minutes.

In his hypothesis, Haldane predicted that if the ascent rate does not allow the partial pressure of the inert gas (nitrogen) in each of the hypothetical tissues to exceed the environmental pressure by more than twice (2:1 ratio), then bubbles will not form in these tissues. Basically this meant that one could ascend from a depth of 30 metres (100 ft) – an ambient pressure of 4 bars (60 psi) – to 10 metres (33 ft) (2 bars (29 psi)) or from 10 metres (33 ft) (2 bars (30 psi)) to the surface (1 bar (15 psi)) when saturated, without a decompression problem. To ensure this, a number of decompression stops were incorporated into the ascent tables.

The ascent rate and the fastest tissue in the model determine the time and depth of the first stop. Thereafter, the slower tissues determine when it is safe to ascend further.

=== Outline ===
Haldane ran his experiments on some animals, illustrating the difference between different kinds of animals such as goats, guinea-pigs, mice, rats, hens and rabbits, but his main work and results were done on goats and men.

Haldane stated in his paper: "In order to avoid the risk of bubbles being formed on decompression, it has hitherto been recommended that decompression should be slow and at as nearly a uniform rate throughout as possible. We must therefore carefully consider the process of desaturation of the body during slow and uniform decompression", hence the outline of his work is noted:

- When humans or animals are placed in compressed air, the blood passing through lungs takes up an amount of gas in simple solution. This amount increases in proportion to the increase in partial pressure of each gas present in the alveolar air.

- As regards oxygen, the amount in simple solution in arterial blood will increase, but as soon as blood reaches body tissues, the extra dissolved oxygen will be used up so that venous blood will exhibit slight increase in partial pressure of oxygen.
- As regards carbon dioxide, the experiments of Haldane and Greenwood showed that partial pressure of CO_{2} in the alveolar air remains constant with the rise of atmospheric pressure, hence, there can be no increase in CO_{2} in blood during exposure to compressed air.
- As regards nitrogen, considerations should be taken for the saturation in body tissues.

- The rate of saturation of any part of the body with nitrogen
  The rate of solubility of nitrogen per unit mass of tissue, varies greatly in different parts of the body, hence, after a sudden rise in air pressure, varies correspondingly.
- If the pressure is rapidly diminished to normal after exposure to saturation in compressed air, the venous blood will give off the whole of its excess of dissolved nitrogen during its passage to the lungs. If gas bubbles are formed in consequence of too rapid decompression, they will increase in size by diffusion into them, and thus cause blocking of small vessels. In order to avoid the risk of bubbles being formed during decompression, the decompression should be slow, and the rate of blood circulation can be increased considerably by muscular exertion.
- Decompression needs to be staged decompression
  Desaturation during uniform decompression
  When a diver goes down for a very short time, the time occupied in the descent and ascent is taken into account. During descent, the diver is being saturated with nitrogen, so he should descend as rapidly as practical. During ascent on the other hand, Haldane showed that at the end of decompression there is a dangerous excess of saturation in all parts of the body except those which half-saturated in less than about seven or eight minutes. The goats used for stage decompression experiments were subjected to uniform decompression in same time and exposure, and within thirty-six decompression trials, one died, two were paralyzed, one had indefinite general symptoms of severe character, and eleven other cases of "bends" occurred beside two doubtful cases.
- Diving period:

- For short diving periods of less than seven to eight minutes with no repetitive dive: Haldane's experiments on goats showed that sudden decompression in less than a minute after exposures up to four minutes at 75 psi (5.2 bar), equivalent to 42 metres (138 ft) of sea water, goats did not develop any symptoms, even when exposures were raised to six minutes in some cases. This coincides with reports at that time from the Mediterranean of skilled Greek divers, diving to 30 fathoms (55 m) who, should their gear become entangled on the bottom, will cut their air-pipe and line, and blow themselves up to the surface in less than a minute.
- With dives exceeding a few minutes or brief repetitive dives: Hill and Greenwood compressed themselves to 91 psi (6.3 bar), equivalent to 53 metres (174 ft) of sea water, a very high pressure and risky experiment, and had bends after decompression.
  The saturation curves of Hill and Greenwook's experiment for parts of the body
  The saturation curves of their experiment for parts of the body were published in 1908.

One of Haldane's bent goats. Note the bend in the left foreleg.

- Experiments continued on goats, and symptoms observed on goats were noted each time on appropriated schedule to record the presence of symptoms not the presence of bubbles:

- Bends, the commonest symptom. The limb, most commonly the fore-leg.
- Temporary paralysis, symptom to general deficiency of oxygen
- Pain, continuous bleating
- Permanent paralysis, usually immediately after decompression
- Illness, impossible to identify any local symptoms, sometimes blind
- Dyspnoea and death
- Mechanical symptoms are not important, if goat suffered ear troubles during compression

- Experiments on goats included:

- staged decompression on different pressures, and different decompression times, and included also comparison with uniform decompression. Results showed that a certain minimum pressure is required to give symptoms on goats and that duration of exposure to high pressures with different decompression times had also an influence.
- Experiments compared between different types of animals and their susceptibility to decompression symptoms, and compared influence of size between short and long exposures, and decompression time.
- Experiments on blood mass and volume of goats showed apparently no relation to susceptibility.
- Pathological observations on them post-mortem appearances of goats after decompression, showed practical importance in connection with the size of bubbles found in blood. Pathological changes underlying the chief symptoms were sufficiently noticed, except for bends. The exact cause of bends was not known.

=== Main results of Haldane’s work ===
This work is published in "The Prevention of Compressed-air Illness" book. Results are published in same book under "Summary" in pages 424 and 425. The main conclusions of his decompression model are:

- In page 354, Haldane concluded: "It is clear that the rate of desaturation might be hastened by either (1) increasing the difference in nitrogen pressure between the venous blood and the air in the lungs, or (2) increasing the rate of blood circulation". So, in order to achieve faster desaturation, Haldane concluded that muscular exertion can considerably increase the rate of blood circulation, and thus "there should also be muscular exertion during decompression".
- In summary, page 424, Haldane's fifth conclusion is: "Decompression is not safe if the pressure of nitrogen inside the body becomes much more than twice that of the atmospheric nitrogen". Haldane had placed goats in compression chambers under pressure for long hours, to ensure their tissues were fully saturated with nitrogen, then concluded after these experiments that "if absolute pressure is reduced by 50% it will not provoke DCI".
- Haldane published his "Decompression Tables" Table I and Table II, on pages 442 and 443. For ease of use, convert feet to meters by multiplying by 0.3048, and from psi to bar by multiplying by 0.0689475729. These tables allow divers to ascend to half of their ambient absolute pressure and remain for a calculated decompression time before ascending further to half of the absolute pressure of the last stage. Haldane divided his schedules into Table I for "ordinary exposures" and Table II for "delay beyond the ordinary limits of time". Currently, when assessed, Table II decompression times were associated with great risk of decompression sickness.
- Haldane divided body tissues into different categories, and measured the nitrogen desaturation in each. This led to fast tissues and slow tissues concept, where some tissues fill up with gas and empty it out rapidly; these are the fast tissues. On the other hand, slow tissues are slow filling up and slow emptying out. Haldane portrayed the logarithmic trend of these tissues to fill up and empty out.

== Further developments on Haldane's principles ==
The 2:1 ratio proposed by Haldane was found to be too conservative for fast tissues (short dives) and not conservative enough for slow tissues (long dives). The ratio also seemed to vary with depth. The ascent rates used on older tables were 18 metres per minute (59 ft/min), but newer tables now use 9 metres per minute (30 ft/min).

- Haldane introduced decompression tables based on five tissue compartments with half times of 5, 10, 20, 40 and 75 minutes.
- The US Navy refined Haldane's tables and introduced a model with nine tissues. They also introduced calculations for half-times starting from 5 minutes and reaching up to 240 minutes.
- Professor Albert Bühlmann established decompression tables for diving in high altitude in mountain lakes. His model is based on Haldanian principles but his ZHL-16 tables considered 16 tissues with half-times up to 635 minutes and introduced factors that attempted to model the variation of supersaturation limit with depth.

== Haldane's related work and research ==
J. S. Haldane at his laboratory in Oxford, May 1920. Portrait Collection, Boston Medical Library in the Francis A. Countway Library of Medicine.

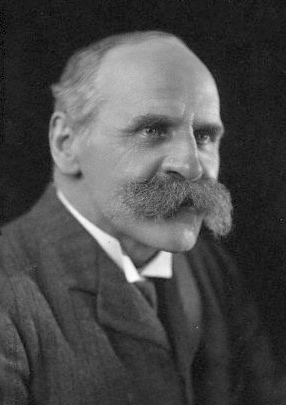
John Scott Haldane in 1910

John Scott Haldane

Haldane had many other related researches:

- Established The Journal of Hygiene
- Manufactured a decompression device to facilitate assistance to deep divers
- Established decompression procedures for air diving to 200 feet or 65 meters for the Royal Navy in 1907, after many animal experiments
- Described the Haldane effect, a property of hemoglobin
- Proposed a formula to determine the coefficients of saturation of different tissues in the body, his equation is based on Henry's law:

$$T_{N_2} = T_0 + (T_f - T_0) \left (1 - (1/2)^{t/t_0} \right )$$
where,

T: tension (pressure) of gas in tissues
T_{0}: initial tension
T_{N_{2}}: current nitrogen tension
T_{f}: final tension
t_{0}: compartment half-time
t: current time

== Contradicting work ==
Although Haldane's model remains the basis for modern decompression tables, Haldane's first decompression tables proved to be far from ideal. Haldane's equation is used by many dive tables and dive computers today, even though a growing number of decompression models contradict its assumptions such as the

- Asymmetry of saturation phenomena of inert gases (uptake and elimination),
- Desaturation according to Hempleman's memorandum and those of Thalmann, taking into account circulating bubbles, VPM, Reduced gradient bubble model.

== Figures and tables from "The Prevention of Compressed-air Illness" ==

page 442, Decompression table-I in ft and psi. "Stoppages during the ascent of a diver after ordinary limits of time from surface."

page 443, Decompression table-II in ft and psi. "Stoppages during the ascent of a diver after delay beyond the ordinary limits of time from surface."
