= Varying Permeability Model =

Decompression model and algorithm based on bubble physics

The Varying Permeability Model, Variable Permeability Model or VPM is an algorithm that is used to calculate the decompression needed for ambient pressure dive profiles using specified breathing gases. It was developed by D.E. Yount and others for use in professional and recreational diving. It was developed to model laboratory observations of bubble formation and growth in both inanimate and in vivo systems exposed to pressure. In 1986, this model was applied by researchers at the University of Hawaiʻi to calculate diving decompression tables.

Several variations of the algorithm have been used in mobile and desktop dive planning software and in dive computers.

== Theoretical basis ==
The VPM presumes that microscopic bubble nuclei always exist in water and tissues that contain water. Any nuclei larger than a specific "critical" size, which is related to the maximum dive depth (exposure pressure), will grow during decompression when the diver ascends. The VPM aims to minimize the total volume of these growing bubbles by keeping the external pressure sufficiently large and the inspired inert gas partial pressures relatively low during decompression. The model depends on the assumptions that different sizes of bubbles exist within the body, that the larger bubbles require less reduction in pressure to begin to grow than smaller ones, and that fewer large bubbles exist than smaller ones. These assumptions can be used to construct an algorithm that provides decompression schedules, designed to eliminate the larger, growing bubbles before they cause problems.

Varying permeability refers to the layer of molecules surrounding the bubbles, which may vary in permeability to gas molecules in the bubble and the surrounding medium, and which affect the diffusion of gases between the surroundings and the bubble, and the variation of compressibility of the bubble under changes of pressure.

== Bibliography ==
This bibliography list was compiled by E.B. Maiken and E.C. Baker as reference material for the V-Planner web site in 2002.

=== Primary Modeling Sources ===
- Yount, D.E.; Hoffman, D.C. (1984). Bachrach, Arthur J.; Matzen, M.M. (eds.). Decompression theory: A dynamic critical-volume hypothesis. Underwater physiology VIII: Proceedings of the eighth symposium on underwater physiology. Bethesda: Undersea and Hyperbaric Medical Society. pp. 131–146.
- Yount, D.E.; Hoffman, D.C. (1986). "On the use of a bubble formation model to calculate diving tables". Aviat Space Environ Med. 57 (2): 149–156. ISSN 0095-6562. PMID 3954703.
- Yount, D.E.; Hoffman, D.C. (1989). "On the use of a bubble formation model to calculate nitrogen and helium diving tables". In Paganelli, C.V.; Farhi, L.E. (eds.). Physiological functions in special environments. New York: Springer-Verlag. pp. 95–108.
- Yount, D.E.; Maiken, E.B.; Baker, E.C. (2000). Lang, M.A.; Lehner, C.E. (eds.). Implications of the Varying Permeability Model for Reverse Dive Profiles. Proceedings of the Reverse Dive Profiles Workshop. Washington, D.C.: Smithsonian Institution. pp. 29–61.

=== VPM Research and Development Sources ===
- D'Arrigo, J.S. (1978). "Improved method for studying the surface chemistry of bubble formation". Aviat Space Environ Med. 49 (2): 358–361. ISSN 0095-6562. PMID 637789.
- Kunkle, T.D. 1979. Bubble nucleation in supersaturated fluids. Univ. of Hawaii Sea Grant Technical Report UNIHI-SEAGRANT-TR-80-01. Pp. 108.
- Paganelli, C.V.; Strauss, R.H.; Yount, D.E. (1978). "Bubble formation within decompressed hen's eggs". Aviat Space Environ Med. 48 (1): 48–49. ISSN 0095-6562. PMID 831713.
- Strauss, R.H. (1974). "Bubble formation in gelatin: Implications for prevention of decompression sickness". Undersea Biomed. Res. 1 (2): 169–174. ISSN 0093-5387. OCLC 2068005. PMID 4469188. Archived from the original on April 15, 2013.
- Strauss, R.H.; Kunkle, T.D. (1974). "Isobaric bubble growth: A consequence of altering atmospheric gas". Science. 186 (4162): 443–444. Bibcode:1974Sci...186..443S. doi:10.1126/science.186.4162.443. ISSN 0193-4511. OCLC 5206521. PMID 4413996. S2CID 32874911.
- Yount, D.E.; Kunkle, T.D. (1975). "Gas nucleation in the vicinity of solid hydrophobic spheres". Journal of Applied Physics. 46 (10): 4484–4486. Bibcode:1975JAP....46.4484Y. doi:10.1063/1.321381. ISSN 0021-8979. Archived from the original on 2013-02-24.
- Yount, D.E.; Strauss, R.H. (1976). "Bubble formation in gelatin: A model for decompression sickness". Journal of Applied Physics. 47 (11): 5081–5089. Bibcode:1976JAP....47.5081Y. doi:10.1063/1.322469. ISSN 0021-8979. Archived from the original on 2013-02-23.
- Yount, D.E.; Kunkle, T.D.; D'Arrigo, J.S.; Ingle, F.W.; Yeung, C.M.; Beckman, E.L. (1977). "Stabilization of gas cavitation nuclei by surface-active compounds". Aviat Space Environ Med. 48 (3): 185–191. ISSN 0095-6562. PMID 856151.
- Yount, D.E. (1979). "Skins of varying permeability: a stabilization mechanism for gas cavitation nuclei". J. Acoust. Soc. Am. 65 (6): 1429–1439. Bibcode:1979ASAJ...65.1429Y. doi:10.1121/1.382930. ISSN 1520-8524. S2CID 53315872.
- Yount, D.E.; Yeung, C.M.; Ingle, F.W. (1979). "Determination of the radii of gas cavitation nuclei by filtering gelatin". J. Acoust. Soc. Am. 65 (6): 1440–1450. Bibcode:1979ASAJ...65.1440Y. doi:10.1121/1.382905. ISSN 1520-8524.
- Yount, D.E. (1979). "Application of a bubble formation model to decompression sickness in rats and humans". Aviat Space Environ Med. 50 (1): 44–50. ISSN 0095-6562. PMID 217330.
- Yount, D.E. 1979. Multiple inert-gas bubble disease: a review of the theory. In: Lambertsen, C.J. and Bornmann, R.C. eds. Isobaric Inert Gas Counterdiffusion Workshop. Undersea Medical Society, Bethesda, 90-125.
- Yount, D.E.; Lally, D.A. (1980). "On the use of oxygen to facilitate decompression". Aviat Space Environ Med. 51 (6): 544–550. ISSN 0095-6562. PMID 6774706.
- Yount, D.E. (1981). "Application of a bubble formation model to decompression sickness in fingerling salmon". Undersea Biomed. Res. 8 (4): 199–208. ISSN 0093-5387. OCLC 2068005. PMID 7324253. Archived from the original on 2018-05-04.
- Yount, D.E.; Yeung, C.M. (1981). "Bubble formation in supersaturated gelatin: a further investigation of gas cavitation nuclei". J. Acoust. Soc. Am. 69 (3): 702–708. Bibcode:1981ASAJ...69..702Y. doi:10.1121/1.385567. ISSN 1520-8524. S2CID 54050598.
- Yount, D.E. (1982). "On the evolution, generation, and regeneration of gas cavitation nuclei". J. Acoust. Soc. Am. 71 (6): 1473–1481. Bibcode:1982ASAJ...71.1473Y. doi:10.1121/1.387845. ISSN 1520-8524. S2CID 53411356.
- Yount, D.E.; Hoffman, D.C. (1983). Hoyt, J.W. (ed.). "On the use of a cavitation model to calculate diving tables". Cavitation and Multiphase Flow Forum 1983. New York: American Society of Mechanical Engineers: 65–68. OCLC 232584820.
- Yount, D.E. (1983). "A model for microbubble fission in surfactant solutions". Journal of Colloid and Interface Science. 91 (2): 349–360. Bibcode:1983JCIS...91..349Y. doi:10.1016/0021-9797(83)90347-8. ISSN 0021-9797.
- Yount, D.E.; Gillary, E.W.; Hoffman, D.C. (1984). "A microscopic investigation of bubble formation nuclei". J. Acoust. Soc. Am. 76 (5): 1511–1521. Bibcode:1984ASAJ...76.1511Y. doi:10.1121/1.391434. ISSN 1520-8524. S2CID 46764818.
- Yount, D.E. (1997). "On the elastic properties of the interfaces that stabilize gas cavitation nuclei". Journal of Colloid and Interface Science. 193 (1): 50–59. Bibcode:1997JCIS..193...50Y. doi:10.1006/jcis.1997.5048. ISSN 0021-9797. PMID 9299088.

== VPM Dive Planning Software ==
- V-Planner: VPM-B & VPM-B/E, VPM-B/FBO.
- MultiDeco: VPM-B & VPM-B/E, VPM-B/FBO, ZHL-B, ZHL-C, GF, and GFS.
- Ultimate Planner: VPM-B, VPM-B/U, VPM-B (Dec-12), VPM-B/U (Dec-12), ZHL-B, ZHL-C, ZHL-D, GF and GF/U.
- DecoPlanner: VPM-B.
- HLPlanner: VPM-B.
- JDeco: VPM-B.
- PalmVPM: VPM.
- DivePlan: VPM.
- Baltic Deco Planner: VPM-B.
- Subsurface: VPM-B.

== VPM Dive computers ==
- V-Planner Live: VPM-B & VPM-B/E.
- MultiDeco-X1: VPM-B & VPM-B/E, VPM-B/FBO, ZHL-C, GF, and GFS.
- MultiDeco-DR5: VPM-B & VPM-B/E, VPM-B/FBO, ZHL-C, GF, and GFS.
- Shearwater Research Predator, Petrel, Perdix and NERD models: GF, VPM-B plus GFS.
- RATIO Computers: iX3M series and iDive (Tech and Reb) series VPM-B and ZHL16-B.
- TDC-3 with MultiDeco-TDC: VPM-B & VPM-B/E, VPM-B/FBO, ZHL-C, GF, and GFS.
- HeinrichsWeikamp OSTC4: VPM-B

== See also ==
- Decompression (diving) – Pressure reduction and its effects during ascent from depth
- Decompression sickness – Disorder caused by dissolved gases forming bubbles in tissues
- Decompression tables – Tabulated data to facilitate safe diving ascents
- Decompression theory – Theoretical modelling of decompression physiology
- Dive computer – Instrument to calculate decompression status in real time
- Physiology of decompression – Physiological basis for decompression theory and practice
- Reduced gradient bubble model – Decompression algorithm
- Bühlmann decompression algorithm – Mathematical model of tissue inert gas uptake and release with pressure change
- Thalmann algorithm – Mathematical model for diver decompression
