= Arthur J. Bachrach =

American psychologist and administrator (1923–2011)

- Born: March 20, 1923; New York City
- Died: December 19, 2011 (aged 88)
- Scientific career
- Institutions: Arizona State University, Naval Medical Research Institute

Arthur J. Bachrach (March 20, 1923 – December 19, 2011) was an American psychologist and administrator, who was Professor and Chairman of the Department of Psychology at Arizona State University, and Director of the Environmental Stress Program and Chair of Psychophysiology at the Naval Medical Research Institute at the Naval Medical Center in Bethesda.

== Biography ==
Art Bachrach was born in New York City on March 20, 1923, to Harry Bachrach and Pearl Moss Bachrach. He served in the U.S. Army from 1943 to 1946, and then studied at University of Virginia, where he received his Ph.D. in 1952. Bachrach married Mary Susan Clement on September 11, 1954. Their first son, John, was born in 1957 and their second son, Hunter, was born in 1958.

Bachrach kept working at the Faculty in the University of Virginia Medical School, attaining the rank of Associate Professor in the Department of Neurology and Psychiatry. In 1962, he left the University of Virginia to accept the position of Professor and Chairman of the Department of Psychology at Arizona State University. From 1969 to 1987 he worked as Director of the Environmental Stress Program and Chair of Psychophysiology at the Naval Medical Research Institute at the Naval Medical Center in Bethesda.

At the end of the 1950s he was among the first members of the Society for General Systems Research. He was Senior Editor and Co-editor on several publications of the Underwater Physiology Symposia and a member of the Founding Editorial Board of the Undersea Biomedical Research Journal, a publication of the Undersea and Hyperbaric Medical Society.

After retiring, Bachrach and his wife, moved to Taos, New Mexico, where they had established a home and a bookshop named "Moby Dickens," which they had founded in 1984. Art died at home in December 2011, and Susan died, also at home, in October 2013. The bookshop was sold in 2013. Art, an incorrigible punster, affectionately referred to the out-of-print section as "Moldy Dickens". Bachrach was an active member of the D. H. Lawrence Society of North America.

Bachrach was awarded the U. S. Navy's Civilian Meritorious Achievement Medal in 1987, and the Academy of Underwater Arts and Sciences' NOGI Award in 1973. and NOGI fellowship in 2007. Art died at his home south of Taos the morning of December 19, 2011.

== Work ==
=== Undersea research ===
At Arizona State University Bachrach participated as a researcher on the Navy's deep diving undersea program SeaLab III. When he became director of the Naval Medical Research Institute at the National Naval Medical Center, he supervised and developed underwater and extreme environment research (cold, heat) projects at the Institute as well as collaborative projects in Sweden, Canada, Japan, France and the United Kingdom. For example, the 1982 research of the performance and physiology of the JIM suit system. He was also consultant to the Navy's marine mammal program and a member of the Navy's Shark Research Panel.

=== D. H. Lawrence in New Mexico ===
D. H. Lawrence had spent three six month visits to Taos between 1922 and 1925. After researching these, Art Bachrach, relates many tales of Lawrence's time there. He has come to know people who freely recalled the Lawrences. They shared information about the circle of artists and friends who surrounded the Lawrences and their lifestyles. Bachrach provides information on Lawrence's writings and the influence living in the mountains of New Mexico had upon him.

== Publications ==
Bachrach has authored or edited fourteen books, and published over 180 articles in scientific journals and chapters in textbooks and symposia. Books, a selection:

- 1954, Outline of abnormal psychology, edited by Gardner Murphy and Arthur J. Bachrach.
- 1961, Perception in experimental foundations of clinical psychology. with Israel Goldiamond.
- 1962, Experimental foundations of clinical psychology.
- 1962, Psychological research; an introduction.
- 1987, Stress and performance in diving
- 2006, D. H. Lawrence in New Mexico : "the time is different there"
