= Reduced gradient bubble model =

Decompression algorithm

The reduced gradient bubble model (RGBM) is an algorithm developed by Bruce Wienke for calculating decompression stops needed for a particular dive profile. It is related to the Varying Permeability Model. but is conceptually different in that it rejects the gel-bubble model of the varying permeability model.

It is used in several dive computers, particularly those made by Suunto, Aqwary, Mares, HydroSpace Engineering, and Underwater Technologies Center. It is characterised by the following assumptions: blood flow (perfusion) provides a limit for tissue gas penetration by diffusion; an exponential distribution of sizes of bubble seeds is always present, with many more small seeds than large ones; bubbles are permeable to gas transfer across surface boundaries under all pressures; the haldanean tissue compartments range in half time from 1 to 720 minutes, depending on gas mixture.

Some manufacturers such as Suunto have devised approximations of Wienke's model. Suunto uses a modified haldanean nine-compartment model with the assumption of reduced off-gassing caused by bubbles. This implementation offers both a depth ceiling and a depth floor for the decompression stops. The former maximises tissue off-gassing and the latter minimises bubble growth. The model has been correlated and validated in a number of published articles using collected dive profile data.

== Description ==
The model is based on the assumption that phase separation during decompression is random, yet highly probable, in body tissue, and that a bubble will continue to grow by acquiring gas from adjacent saturated tissue, at a rate depending on the local free/dissolved concentration gradient. Gas exchange mechanisms are fairly well understood in comparison with nucleation and stabilization mechanisms, which are computationally uncertainly defined. Nevertheless there is an opinion among some decompression researchers that the existing practices and studies on bubbles and nuclei provide useful information on bubble growth and elimination processes and the time scales involved. Wienke considers that the consistency between these practices and the underlying physical principles suggest directions for decompression modelling for algorithms beyond parameter fitting and extrapolation. He considers that the RGBM implements the theoretical model in these aspects and also supports the efficacy of recently developed safe diving practice due to its dual phase mechanics. These include:

- reduced no-stop time limits;
- safety stops in the 10-20 fsw depth zone;
- ascent rates not exceeding 30 fsw per minute;
- restricted repetitive exposures, particularly beyond 100 fsw,
- restricted reverse profile and deep spike diving;
- restricted multi day activity;
- smooth coalescence of bounce and saturation limit points;
- consistent diving protocols for altitude;
- deep stops for decompression, extended range, and mixed gas diving with overall shorter decompression times, particularly in the shallow zone;
- use of helium rich mixtures for technical diving, with shallower isobaric switches to nitrox than suggested by Haldanian strategies;
- use of pure oxygen in the shallow zone to efficiently eliminate both dissolved and bubble phase inert gases.
