= Decompression practice =

Techniques and procedures for safe decompression of divers

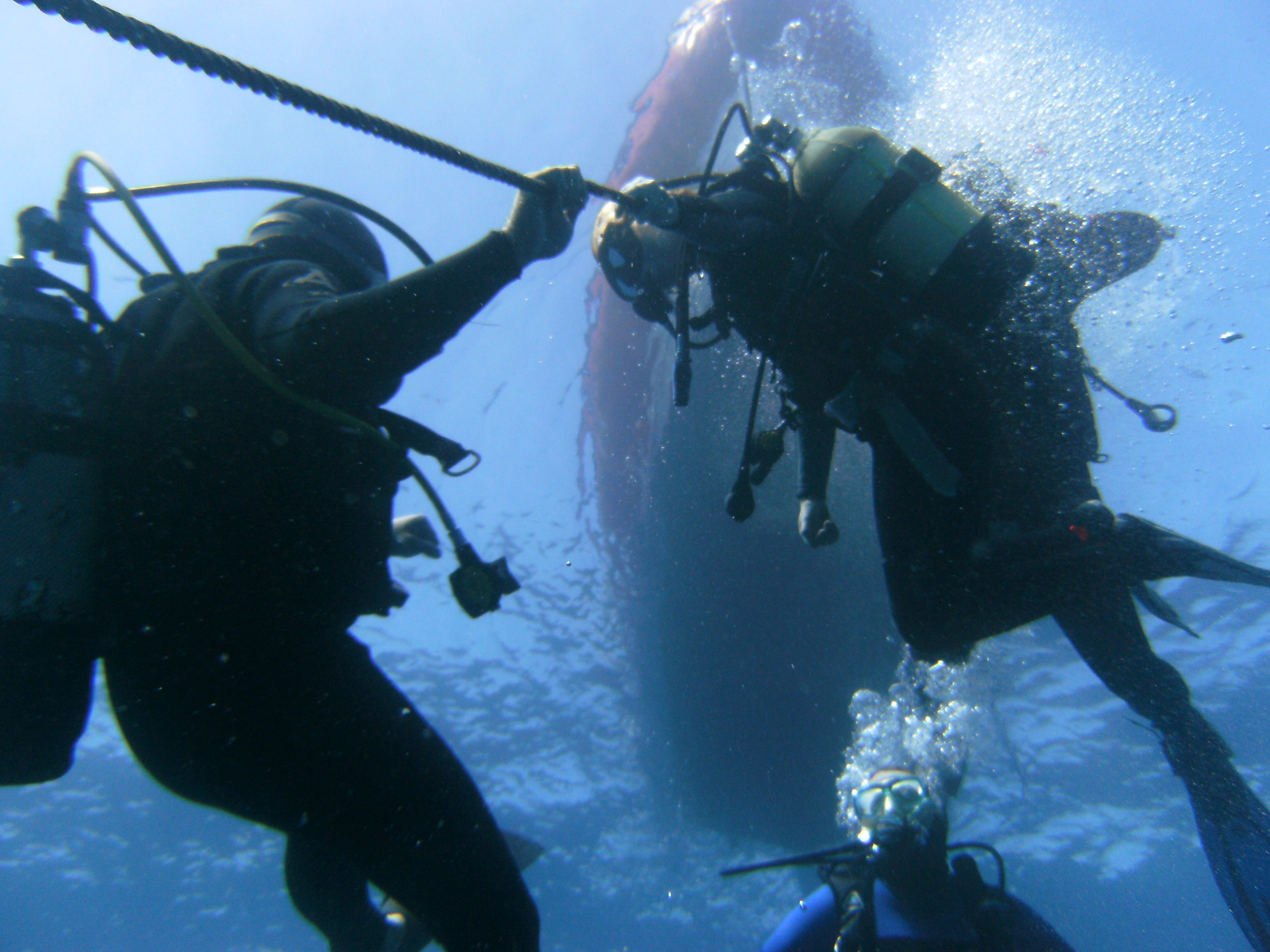
Divers using the anchor cable as an aid to depth control during their ascent for a decompression stop

To prevent or minimize decompression sickness, divers must properly plan, conduct, and monitor decompression. The ambient pressure is higher underwater, and more so as the depth increases. Breathing at ambient pressures greater than surface atmospheric pressure causes body tissues to absorb higher and higher levels of dissolved inert gases, which becomes a health risk as the dive continues; divers follow a decompression model in which they interrupt the dive to allow those excess gases to be released while the risk is still acceptable. Decompression models take into account variables such as depth and time of dive, breathing gasses, altitude, and equipment to develop appropriate procedures for safe ascent.

Decompression may be continuous or staged, where the ascent is interrupted by stops at regular depth intervals, but the entire ascent is part of the decompression, and ascent rate can be critical to harmless elimination of inert gas. What is commonly known as no-decompression diving, or more accurately no-stop decompression, relies on limiting ascent rate for avoidance of excessive bubble formation. Staged decompression may include deep stops depending on the theoretical model used for calculating the ascent schedule. Omission of decompression theoretically required for a dive profile exposes the diver to significantly higher risk of symptomatic decompression sickness, and in severe cases, serious injury or death. The risk is related to the severity of exposure and the level of supersaturation of tissues in the diver. Procedures for emergency management of omitted decompression and symptomatic decompression sickness have been published. These procedures are generally effective, but vary in effectiveness from case to case.

The procedures used for decompression depend on the mode of diving, the available equipment, the site and environment, and the actual dive profile. Standardized procedures have been developed which provide an acceptable level of risk in the circumstances for which they are appropriate. Different sets of procedures are used by commercial, military, scientific and recreational divers, though there is considerable overlap where similar equipment is used, and some concepts are common to all decompression procedures. In particular, all types of surface oriented diving benefited significantly from the acceptance of personal dive computers in the 1990s, which facilitated decompression practice and allowed more complex dive profiles at acceptable levels of risk.

== Decompression ==
Decompression in the context of diving derives from the reduction in ambient pressure experienced by the diver during the ascent at the end of a dive or hyperbaric exposure and refers to both the reduction in pressure and the process of allowing dissolved inert gases to be eliminated from the tissues during this reduction in pressure. When a diver descends in the water column the ambient pressure rises. Breathing gas is supplied at the same pressure as the surrounding water, and some of this gas dissolves into the diver's blood and other fluids. Inert gas continues to be taken up until the gas dissolved in the diver is in a state of equilibrium with the breathing gas in the diver's lungs, (see: "Saturation diving"), or the diver moves up in the water column and reduces the ambient pressure of the breathing gas until the inert gases dissolved in the tissues are at a higher concentration than the equilibrium state, and start diffusing out again. Dissolved inert gases such as nitrogen or helium can form bubbles in the blood and tissues of the diver if the partial pressures of the dissolved gases in the diver gets too high above the ambient pressure. These bubbles and products of injury caused by the bubbles can cause damage to tissues known as decompression sickness, or "the bends". The immediate goal of controlled decompression is to avoid development of symptoms of bubble formation in the tissues of the diver, and the long-term goal is to also avoid complications due to sub-clinical decompression injury.

A diver who exceeds the no-decompression limit for a decompression algorithm or table has a theoretical tissue gas loading which is considered likely to cause symptomatic bubble formation unless the ascent follows a decompression schedule, and is said to have a decompression obligation.

== Common procedures ==
=== Descent rate ===
Descent rate is generally allowed for in decompression planning by assuming a maximum descent rate specified in the instructions for the use of the tables, but it is not critical. Descent slower than the nominal rate reduces useful bottom time, but has no other adverse effect. Descent faster than the specified maximum will expose the diver to greater ingassing rate earlier in the dive, and the bottom time must be reduced accordingly. In the case of real-time monitoring by dive computer, descent rate is not specified, as the consequences are automatically accounted for by the programmed algorithm.

=== Bottom time ===
Bottom time is the time spent at depth before starting the ascent. Bottom time used for decompression planning may be defined differently depending on the tables or algorithm used. It may include descent time, but not in all cases. It is important to check how bottom time is defined for the tables before they are used. For example, tables using Bühlmann's algorithm define bottom time as the elapsed time between leaving the surface and the start of the final ascent at 10 metres per minute, and if the ascent rate is slower, then the excess of the ascent time to the first required decompression stop needs to be considered part of the bottom time for the tables to remain safe.

=== Ascent rate ===
The ascent is an important part of the process of decompression, as this is the time when reduction of ambient pressure occurs, and it is of critical importance to safe decompression that the ascent rate is compatible with safe elimination of inert gas from the diver's tissues. Ascent rate must be limited to prevent supersaturation of tissues to the extent that unacceptable bubble development occurs. This is usually done by specifying a maximum ascent rate compatible with the decompression model chosen. This will be specified in the decompression tables or the user manual for the decompression software or personal decompression computer. The instructions will usually include contingency procedures for deviation from the specified rate, both for delays and exceeding the recommended rate. Failure to comply with these specifications will generally increase the risk of decompression sickness.

Typically maximum ascent rates are in the order of 10 metres (33 ft) per minute for dives deeper than 6 metres (20 ft). Some dive computers have variable maximum ascent rates, depending on depth. Ascent rates slower than the recommended standard for the algorithm will generally be treated by a computer as part of a multilevel dive profile and the decompression requirement adjusted accordingly. Faster ascent rates will elicit a warning and additional decompression stop time to compensate.

== Monitoring decompression status ==
Decompression status is the assumed gas loading of the diver's tissues, based on the chosen decompression model, and either calculated by a dive computer or estimated from dive tables by the diver or diving supervisor, and an indication of the decompression stress that will be incurred by decompressing to a lower ambient pressure. The decompression status of the diver must be known before starting the ascent, so that an appropriate decompression schedule can be followed to avoid an excessive risk of decompression sickness. Scuba divers are responsible for monitoring their own decompression status, as they are the only ones to have access to the necessary information. Surface supplied divers depth profile and elapsed time can be monitored by the surface team, and the responsibility for keeping track of the diver's decompression status is generally part of the supervisor's job.

The supervisor will generally assess decompression status based on dive tables, maximum depth and elapsed bottom time of the dive, though multi-level calculations are possible. Depth is measured at the gas panel by pneumofathometer, which can be done at any time without distracting the diver from their activity. The instrument does not record a depth profile, and requires intermittent action by the panel operator to measure and record the current depth. Elapsed dive time and bottom time are easily monitored using a stopwatch. Worksheets for monitoring the dive profile are available, and include space for listing the ascent profile including decompression stop depths, time of arrival, and stop time. If repetitive dives are involved, residual nitrogen status is also calculated and recorded, and used to determine the decompression schedule. A surface supplied diver may also carry a bottom timer or decompression computer to provide an accurate record of the actual dive profile, and the computer output may be taken into account when deciding on the ascent profile. The dive profile recorded by a dive computer would be valuable evidence in the event of an accident investigation.

Scuba divers can monitor decompression status by using maximum depth and elapsed time in the same way, and can use those to either select from a previously compiled set of surfacing schedules, or identify the recommended profile from a waterproof dive table taken along on the dive. It is possible to calculate a decompression schedule for a multilevel dive using this system, but the possibility of error is significant due to the skill and attention required, and the table format, which can be misread under task loading or in poor visibility. The current trend is towards the use of dive computers to calculate the decompression obligation in real time, using depth and time data automatically input into the processing unit, and continuously displayed on the output screen. Dive computers have become quite reliable, but can fail in service for a variety of reasons, and it is prudent to have a backup system available to estimate a reasonable safe ascent if the computer fails. This can be a backup computer, a written schedule with watch and depth gauge, or the dive buddy's computer if they have a reasonably similar dive profile. If only no-stop diving is done, and the diver makes sure that the no-stop limit is not exceeded, a computer failure can be managed at acceptable risk by starting an immediate direct ascent to the surface at an appropriate ascent rate.

== Modes of decompression ==
These are the variety of ways a diver may decompress, depending on the dive profile and the mode of diving used.

Decompression is a part of every ambient pressure dive. Modes of decompression range from "no-stop dives" where a limited and controlled ascent rate is sufficient decompression, to decompression from saturation over several days.

Decompression can be continuous, where no stops are required, and the rate of ascent is limited to provide sufficient time to offgas safely, or staged, where ascent is made up to and between stops a limited rate, but most of the offgassing occurs during periods of constant depth, (pressure) called decompression stops. Continuous decompression rates depend on the theoretical gas loading of the controlling tissue, and may be fixed or, more often, variable with depth.

Decompression can also be done entirely in the water, partly in the water and partly in a surface decompression chamber or entirely in a decompression chamber.

It can also be classified by the type of breathing gases used while decompressing, whether there are changes in gas composition during decompression, and whether the changes are stepwise or continuous, or a combination of both.

Air diving traditionally uses air as breathing gas for the entire dive, including for in-water staged decompression. It is simple, low cost, requires little or no special equipment, but is inefficient and limited to tolerable in-water exposures.

=== No-decompression stop dives ===
A "no-stop dive", also commonly but inaccurately referred to as a "no-decompression" dive is a dive that needs no decompression stops during the ascent according to the chosen algorithm or tables, and relies on a controlled ascent rate for the elimination of excess inert gases. In effect, the diver is doing continuous decompression during the ascent.

==== No-stop limit ====
The "no-stop limit", or "no-decompression limit" (NDL), is the time interval that a diver may theoretically spend at a given depth without having to perform any decompression stops while surfacing. The NDL helps divers plan dives so that they can stay at a given depth for a limited time and then ascend without stopping while still avoiding an unacceptable risk of decompression sickness. A dive within the no-stop limit may be referred to as a no-stop dive.

The NDL is a theoretical time obtained by calculating inert gas uptake and release in the body, using a decompression model. Although the science of calculating these limits has been refined since Haldane's original model, there is still much that is unknown about how inert gases enter and leave the human body, and the NDL may vary between decompression models for identical initial conditions. In addition, every individual's body is unique and may absorb and release inert gases at different rates at different times. For this reason, dive tables typically have a degree of conservatism built into their recommendations. Divers can and do suffer decompression sickness while remaining inside NDLs, though the incidence is very low. On dive tables a set of NDLs for a range of depth intervals is printed in a grid that can be used to plan dives. There are many different tables available as well as software programs and calculators, which will calculate no decompression limits. Most personal decompression computers (dive computers) will indicate a remaining no decompression limit at the current depth during a dive. The displayed interval is continuously revised to take into account changes of depth and elapsed time, and where relevant, changes of breathing gas. Dive computers also usually have a planning function which will display the NDL for a chosen depth taking the diver's recent decompression history, as recorded by that computer, into account.

==== Safety stop ====
As a precaution against any unnoticed dive computer malfunction, diver error or physiological predisposition to decompression sickness, many divers do an extra "safety stop" (precautionary decompression stop) in addition to those prescribed by their dive computer or tables. A safety stop is typically 1 to 5 minutes at 3 to 6 metres (10 to 20 ft). They are usually done during no-stop dives and may be added to the obligatory decompression on staged dives. Many dive computers indicate a recommended safety stop as standard procedure for dives beyond specific limits of depth and time. The Goldman decompression model predicts a significant risk reduction following a safety stop on a low-risk dive

A safety stop can significantly reduce decompression stress as indicated by venous gas emboli, but if remaining in the water to do a safety stop increases risk due to another hazard, such as running out of gas underwater or a significant medical emergency then the overall safety of the diver may be best served by omitting the safety stop. A similar balancing of hazard and risk also applies to surfacing with omitted decompression, or bringing an unresponsive, non-breathing, diver to the surface. If the risk appears greater for completing the decompression then further decompression should be omitted. A bend can usually be treated, whereas drowning, cardiac arrest, or bleeding out in the water is likely to be terminal. A further complication arises when the buddy must decide whether they will also truncate decompression and put themself at risk in the interests of helping the diver in difficulty. In these situations the actual risk is seldom known with any accuracy, making the decision more difficult for the divers in the water.

=== Continuous decompression ===
Continuous decompression is decompression without stops. Instead of a fairly rapid ascent rate to the first stop, followed by a period at static depth during the stop, the ascent is slower, but without officially stopping. In theory this may be the optimum decompression profile. In practice it is very difficult to do manually, and it may be necessary to stop the ascent occasionally to get back on schedule, but these stops are not part of the schedule, they are corrections. For example, USN treatment table 5, referring to treatment in a decompression chamber for type 1 decompression sickness, states "Descent rate - 20 ft/min. Ascent rate - Not to exceed 1 ft/min. Do not compensate for slower ascent rates. Compensate for faster rates by halting the ascent."

To further complicate the practice, the ascent rate may vary with the depth, and is typically faster at greater depth and reduces as the depth gets shallower. In practice a continuous decompression profile may be approximated by ascent in steps as small as the chamber pressure gauge will resolve, and timed to follow the theoretical profile as closely as conveniently practicable. For example, USN treatment table 7 (which may be used if decompression sickness has reoccurred during initial treatment in the compression chamber) states "Decompress with stops every 2 feet for times shown in profile below." The profile shows an ascent rate of 2 fsw (feet of sea water) every 40 min from 60 fsw to 40 fsw, followed by 2 ft every hour from 40 fsw to 20 fsw and 2 ft every two hours from 20 fsw to 4 fsw.

=== Staged decompression ===
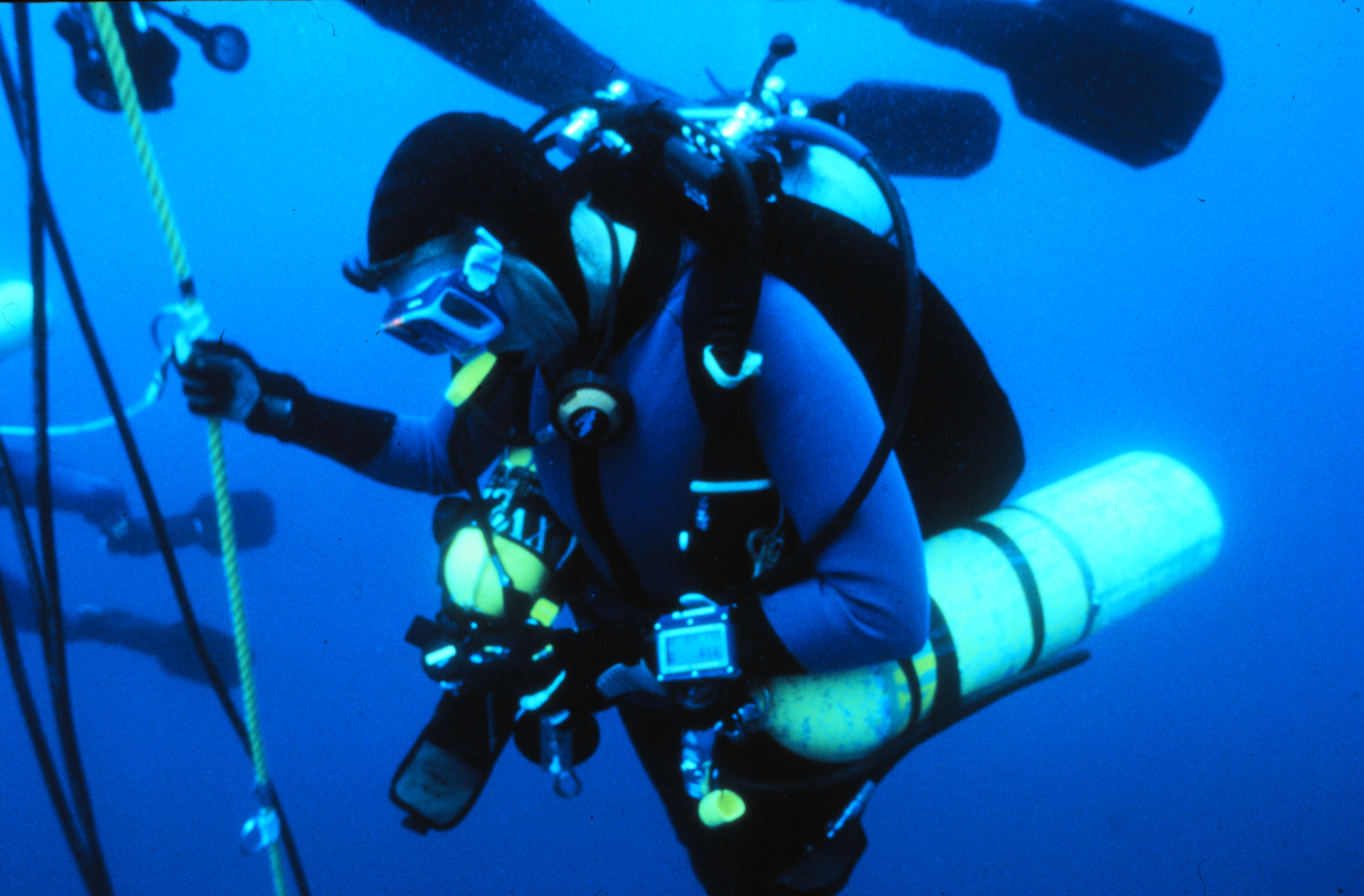
Technical diver at a decompression stop.

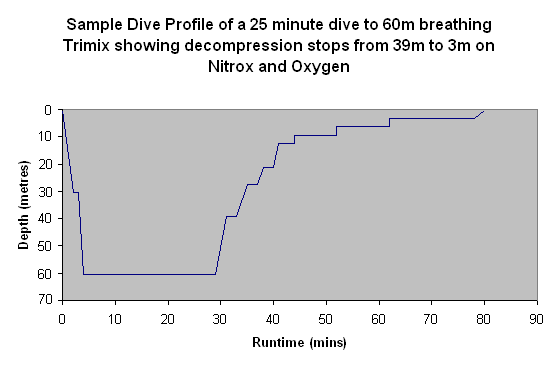

Decompression which follows the procedure of relatively fast ascent interrupted by periods at constant depth is known as staged decompression. The ascent rate and the depth and duration of the stops are integral parts of the decompression process. The advantage of staged decompression is that it is far easier to monitor and control than continuous decompression.

==== Decompression stops ====
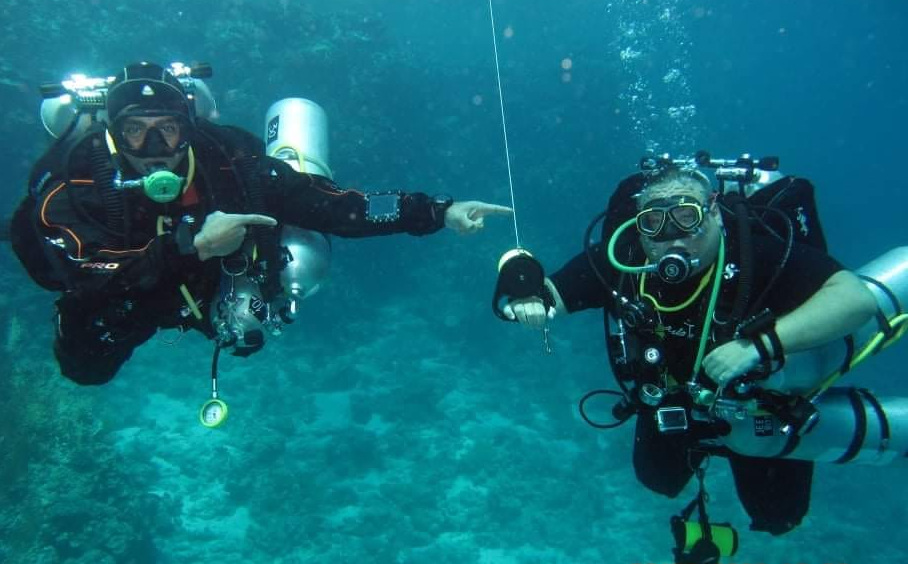
Scuba divers at a decompression stop using a reel and decompression buoy to help keep constant depth and alert the surface as to their location and status.

A decompression stop is the period a diver must spend at a relatively shallow constant depth during ascent after a dive to safely eliminate absorbed inert gases from the body tissues sufficiently to avoid decompression sickness. The practice of making decompression stops is called staged decompression, as opposed to continuous decompression.

The diver or diving supervisor identifies the requirement for decompression stops, and if they are needed, the depths and durations of the stops, by using decompression tables, software planning tools or a dive computer.

The ascent is made at the recommended rate until the diver reaches the depth of the first stop. The diver then maintains the specified stop depth for the specified period, before ascending to the next stop depth at the recommended rate, and follows the same procedure again. This is repeated until all required decompression has been completed and the diver reaches the surface. The intermittent ascents before the first stop, between stops, and from the last stop to the surface are traditionally known as "pulls".

Once on the surface, the diver will continue to eliminate inert gas until the concentrations have returned to normal surface saturation, which can take several hours. Inert gas elimination is considered in some models to be effectively complete after 12 hours, while other models show it can take up to, or even more than 24 hours.

The depth and duration of each stop is calculated to reduce the inert gas excess in the most critical tissues to a concentration which will allow further ascent without unacceptable risk. Consequently, if there is not much dissolved gas, the stops will be shorter and shallower than if there is a high concentration. The length of the stops is also strongly influenced by which tissue compartments are assessed as highly saturated. High concentrations in slow tissues will indicate longer stops than similar concentrations in fast tissues.

Shorter and shallower decompression dives may only need one single short shallow decompression stop, for example, 5 minutes at 3 metres (10 ft). Longer and deeper dives often need a series of decompression stops, each stop being longer but shallower than the previous stop.

==== Deep stops ====
A deep stop was originally an extra stop introduced by divers during ascent, at a greater depth than the deepest stop required by their computer algorithm or tables. This practice is based on empirical observations by technical divers such as Richard Pyle, who found that they were less fatigued if they made some additional stops for short periods at depths considerably deeper than those calculated with the currently published decompression algorithms. More recently computer algorithms that are claimed to use deep stops have become available, but these algorithms and the practice of deep stops have not been adequately validated. Deep stops are likely to be made at depths where ingassing continues for some slow tissues, so the addition of deep stops of any kind can only be included in the dive profile when the decompression schedule has been computed to include them, so that such ingassing of slower tissues can be taken into account. Nevertheless, deep stops may be added on a dive that relies on a personal dive computer (PDC) with real-time computation, as the PDC will track the effect of the stop on its decompression schedule. Deep stops are otherwise similar to any other staged decompression, but are unlikely to use a dedicated decompression gas, as they are usually not more than two to three minutes long.

A study by Divers Alert Network in 2004 suggests that addition of a deep (c. 15 m) as well as a shallow (c. 6 m) safety stop to a theoretically no-stop ascent will significantly reduce decompression stress indicated by precordial doppler detected bubble (PDDB) levels. The authors associate this with gas exchange in fast tissues such as the spinal cord and consider that an additional deep safety stop may reduce the risk of spinal cord decompression sickness in recreational diving. A follow-up study found that the optimum duration for the deep safety stop under the experimental conditions was 2.5 minutes, with a shallow safety stop of 3 to 5 minutes. Longer safety stops at either depth did not further reduce PDDB.

In contrast, experimental work comparing the effect of deep stops observed a significant decrease in vascular bubbles following a deep stop after longer shallower dives, and an increase in bubble formation after the deep stop on shorter deeper dives, which is not predicted by the existing bubble model.

A controlled comparative study by the Navy Experimental Diving Unit in the NEDU Ocean Simulation Facility wet-pot comparing the VVAL18 Thalmann Algorithm with a deep stop profile suggests that the deep stops schedule had a greater risk of DCS than the matched (same total stop time) conventional schedule. The proposed explanation was that slower gas washout or continued gas uptake offset benefits of reduced bubble growth at deep stops.

==== Profile determined intermediate stops ====
Profile-dependent intermediate stops (PDIS)s are intermediate stops at a depth above the depth at which the leading compartment for the decompression calculation switches from on gassing to off gassing and below the depth of the first obligatory decompression stop, (or the surface, on a no-stop dive). The ambient pressure at that depth is low enough to ensure that the tissues are mostly off gassing inert gas, although under a very small pressure gradient. This combination is expected to inhibit bubble growth. The leading compartment is generally not the fastest compartment except in very short dives, for which this model does not require an intermediate stop.

The 8 compartment Bühlmann - based UWATEC ZH-L8 ADT MB PMG decompression model in the Scubapro Galileo dive computer processes the dive profile and suggests an intermediate 2-minute stop that is a function of the tissue nitrogen loading at that time, taking into account the accumulated nitrogen from previous dives. Within the Haldanian logic of the model, at least three compartments are off gassing at the prescribed depth - leading compartment and the 5 and 10-minute half time compartments.

A PDIS is not a mandatory stop, nor is it considered a substitute for the more important shallow safety stop on a no-stop dive. Switching breathing gas mix during the ascent will influence the depth of the stop. The PDIS concept was introduced by Sergio Angelini.

==== Decompression schedule ====
A decompression schedule is a specified ascent rate and series of increasingly shallower decompression stops—usually for increasing amounts of time—that a diver performs to outgas inert gases from their body during ascent to the surface to reduce the risk of decompression sickness. In a decompression dive, the decompression phase may make up a large part of the time spent underwater (in many cases it is longer than the actual time spent at depth).

The depth and duration of each stop is dependent on many factors, primarily the profile of depth and time of the dive, but also the breathing gas mix, the interval since the previous dive and the altitude of the dive site. The diver obtains the depth and duration of each stop from a dive computer, decompression tables or dive planning computer software. A technical scuba diver will typically prepare more than one decompression schedule to plan for contingencies such as going deeper than planned or spending longer at depth than planned. Recreational divers often rely on a personal dive computer to allow them to avoid obligatory decompression, while allowing considerable flexibility of dive profile. A surface supplied diver will normally have a diving supervisor at the control point who monitors the dive profile and can adjust the schedule to suit any contingencies as they occur.

==== Missed stops ====
A diver missing a required decompression stop increases the risk of developing decompression sickness. The risk is related to the depth and duration of the missed stops. The usual causes for missing stops are not having enough breathing gas to complete the stops or accidentally losing control of buoyancy. An aim of most basic diver training is to prevent these two faults. There are also less predictable causes of missing decompression stops. Diving suit failure in cold water may force the diver to choose between hypothermia and decompression sickness. Diver injury or marine animal attack may also limit the duration of stops the diver is willing to carry out.

==== Omitted decompression procedures ====
A procedure for dealing with omitted decompression stops is described in the US Navy Diving Manual. In principle the procedure allows a diver who is not yet presenting symptoms of decompression sickness, to go back down and complete the omitted decompression, with some extra time added to deal with the bubbles which are assumed to have formed during the period where the decompression ceiling was violated. Divers who become symptomatic before they can be returned to depth are treated for decompression sickness, and do not attempt the omitted decompression procedure as the risk is considered unacceptable under normal operational circumstances.

If a decompression chamber is available, omitted decompression may be managed by chamber recompression to an appropriate pressure, and decompression following either a surface decompression schedule or a treatment table. If the diver develops symptoms in the chamber, treatment can be started without further delay.

==== Delayed stops ====
A delayed stop occurs when the ascent rate is slower than the nominal rate for a table. A computer will automatically allow for any theoretical ingassing of slow tissues and reduced rate of outgassing for fast tissues, but when following a table, the table will specify how the schedule should be adjusted to compensate for delays during the ascent. Typically a delay in reaching the first stop is added to bottom time, as ingassing of some tissues is assumed, and delays between scheduled stops are ignored, as it is assumed that no further ingassing has occurred. This may be considered a special case of a multi-level dive.

=== Accelerated decompression ===
Decompression can be accelerated by the use of breathing gases during ascent with lowered inert gas fractions (as a result of increased oxygen fraction). This will result in a greater diffusion gradient for a given ambient pressure, and consequently accelerated decompression for a relatively low risk of bubble formation. Nitrox mixtures and oxygen are the most commonly used gases for this purpose, but oxygen rich trimix blends can also be used after a trimix dive, and oxygen rich heliox blends after a heliox dive, and these may reduce risk of isobaric counterdiffusion complications. Doolette and Mitchell showed that when a switch is made to a gas with a different proportion of inert gas components, it is possible for an inert component previously absent, or present as a lower fraction, to in-gas faster than the other inert components are eliminated (inert gas counterdiffusion), sometimes resulting in raising the total tissue tension of inert gases in a tissue to exceed the ambient pressure sufficiently to cause bubble formation, even if the ambient pressure has not been reduced at the time of the gas switch. They conclude that "breathing-gas switches should be scheduled deep or shallow to avoid the period of maximum supersaturation resulting from decompression".

Raised partial pressures of oxygen in the saturation system atmosphere during decompression are standard practice, and minimum values are specified for the safe use of saturation decompression schedules. Since these schedules are typically several days long, the P_{O_{2}} must be limited by pulmonary toxicity considerations, but in an emergency decompression a greater level of pulmonary function degradation may be accepted as less harmful than decompression sickness, as the pulmonary function usually recovers without treatment.

==== Oxygen decompression ====
The use of pure oxygen for accelerated decompression is limited by oxygen toxicity. In open circuit scuba the upper limit for oxygen partial pressure is generally accepted as 1.6 bar, equivalent to a depth of 6 msw (metres of sea water), but in-water and surface decompression at higher partial pressures is routinely used in surface supplied diving operation, both by the military and civilian contractors, as the consequences of CNS oxygen toxicity are considerably reduced when the diver has a secure breathing gas supply. US Navy tables (Revision 6) start in-water oxygen decompression at 30 fsw (9 msw), equivalent to a partial pressure of 1.9 bar, and chamber oxygen decompression at 50 fsw (15 msw), equivalent to 2.5 bar.

=== Repetitive dives ===
Any dive which is started while the tissues retain residual inert gas in excess of the surface equilibrium condition is considered a repetitive dive. This means that the decompression required for the dive is influenced by the diver's decompression history. Allowance must be made for inert gas preloading of the tissues which will result in them containing more dissolved gas than would have been the case if the diver had fully equilibrated before the dive. The diver will need to decompress longer to eliminate this increased gas loading.

==== Repetitive group ====
A repetitive group is a designation applied to a diver with residual gas loading after a dive, who intends to do a repetitive dive using decompression tables. As the gas loading reduces during the surface interval, the group designation changes according to a specified algorithm, generally laid out as a table for convenience, and considered part of the decompression tables. The repetitive group at the end of the surface interval is used to estimate residual tissue loading (residual nitrogen time) at the start of the following dive.

==== Surface interval ====
The surface interval (SI) or surface interval time (SIT) is the time spent by a diver at surface pressure after a dive during which inert gas which was still present at the end of the dive is further eliminated from the tissues. This continues until the tissues are at equilibrium with the surface pressures. This may take several hours. In the case of the US Navy 1956 Air tables, it is considered complete after 12 hours. The US Navy 2008 Air tables specify up to 16 hours for normal exposure. However, other algorithms may require more than 24 hours to assume full equilibrium.

==== Residual nitrogen time ====
For the planned depth of the repetitive dive, a bottom time can be calculated using the relevant algorithm which will provide an equivalent gas loading to the residual gas after the surface interval. This is called "residual nitrogen time" (RNT) when the gas is nitrogen. The RNT is added to the planned "actual bottom time" (ABT) to give an equivalent "total bottom time" (TBT), also called "total nitrogen time" (TNT), which is used to derive the appropriate decompression schedule for the planned dive.

Equivalent residual times can be derived for other inert gases. These calculations are done automatically in personal diving computers, based on the diver's recent diving history, which is the reason why personal diving computers should not be shared by divers, and why a diver should not switch computers without a sufficient surface interval (more than 24 hours in most cases, up to 4 days, depending on the tissue model and recent diving history of the user).

Residual inert gas can be computed for all modeled tissues, but repetitive group designations in decompression tables are generally based on only the one tissue, considered by the table designers to be the most limiting tissue for likely applications. In the case of the US Navy Air Tables (1956) this is the 120-minute tissue, while the Bühlmann tables use the 80-minute tissue.

=== Decompression at altitude ===
The atmospheric pressure decreases with altitude, and this has an effect on the absolute pressure of the diving environment. The most important effect is that the diver must decompress to a lower surface pressure, and this requires longer decompression for the same dive profile. A second effect is that a diver ascending to altitude, will be decompressing en route, and will have residual nitrogen until all tissues have equilibrated to the local pressures. This means that the diver should consider any dive done before equilibration as a repetitive dive, even if it is the first dive in several days. The US Navy diving manual provides repetitive group designations for listed altitude changes. These will change over time with the surface interval according to the relevant table.

Altitude corrections (Cross corrections) are described in the US Navy diving manual. This procedure is based on the assumption that the decompression model will produce equivalent predictions for the same pressure ratio. The "Sea Level Equivalent Depth" (SLED) for the planned dive depth, which is always deeper than the actual dive at altitude, is calculated in inverse proportion to the ratio of surface pressure at the dive site to sea level atmospheric pressure.

Sea level equivalent depth = Actual depth at altitude × Pressure at sea level ÷ Pressure at altitude

Decompression stop depths are also corrected, using the ratio of surface pressures, and will produce actual stop depths which are shallower than the sea level stop depths.

Stop depth at altitude = Stop depth at sea level × Pressure at altitude ÷ Pressure at sea level

These values can be used with standard open circuit decompression tables, but are not applicable with constant oxygen partial pressure as provided by closed circuit rebreathers. Tables are used with the sea level equivalent depth and stops are done at the altitude stop depth.

The decompression algorithms can be adjusted to compensate for altitude. This was first done by Bühlmann for deriving altitude corrected tables, and is now common on diving computers, where an altitude setting can be selected by the user, or altitude may be measured by the computer if it is programmed to take surface atmospheric pressure into account.

== Flying and ascent to altitude after diving ==
Exposure to reduced atmospheric pressure during the period after a dive when the residual gas levels have not yet stabilized at atmospheric saturation levels can incur a risk of decompression sickness. Rules for safe ascent are based on extension of the decompression model calculations to the desired altitude, but are generally simplified to a few fixed periods for a range of exposures. For the extreme case of an exceptional exposure dive, the US Navy requires a surface interval of 48 hours before ascent to altitude. A surface interval of 24 hours for a Heliox decompression dive and 12 hours for Heliox no-decompression dive are also specified. More detailed surface interval requirements based on the highest repetitive group designator obtained in the preceding 24‑hour period are given on the US Navy Diving Manual Table 9.6, both for ascents to specified altitudes, and for commercial flights in aircraft nominally pressurized to 8000 ft.

The first DAN flying after diving workshop in 1989 consensus guidelines recommended:

- wait for 12 hours before flying after up to two hours of no-stop diving within the previous 48 hours;
- wait for 24 hours before flying after multi-day, unlimited no-stop diving;
- wait for 24–48 hours before flying after dives that required decompression stops;
- do not fly with DCS symptoms unless necessary to obtain hyperbaric treatment.

DAN later proposed a simpler 24-hour wait after any and all recreational diving, but there were objections on the grounds that such a long delay would result in lost business for island diving resorts and the risks of DCS when flying after diving were too low to warrant this blanket restraint.

The DAN Flying after Diving workshop of 2002 made the following recommendations for flying after recreational diving:

- a 12-hour surface interval for uncertified individuals who took part in a "resort" or introductory scuba experience;
- an 18-hour surface interval for certified divers who make an unlimited number of no-decompression air or nitrox dives over multiple days; and
- substantially longer than 18 hours for technical divers who make decompression dives or used helium breathing mixes, as no specific evidence concerning decompression or helium diving was available. There is insufficient data to recommend a definite interval for this case. 24 hours is suggested, with the rider that the risk is unknown and that longer would be better.

These recommendations apply to flying at a cabin pressure with an altitude equivalent of 2,000 to 8,000 feet (610 to 2,440 m). At cabin or aircraft altitudes below 2,000 feet (610 m) the surface interval could theoretically be shorter, but there is insufficient data to make a firm recommendation. Following the recommendations for altitudes above 2,000 feet (610 m) would be conservative. At cabin altitudes between 8,000 and 10,000 feet (2,400 and 3,000 m), hypoxia would be an additional stressor to reduced ambient pressure. DAN suggest doubling the recommended interval based on the dive history.

NASA astronauts train underwater to simulate the weightlessness and occasionally need to fly afterwards at cabin altitudes not exceeding 10,000 feet (3,000 meters). Training dives use 46% Nitrox and can exceed six hours at a maximum depth of 40 ffw (12 mfw) for a maximum equivalent air depth (EAD) of 24 fsw (7 msw). NASA guidelines for EADs of 20–50 fsw (6–15 msw) with maximum dive durations of 100–400 minutes allow either air or oxygen to be breathed in the preflight surface intervals. Oxygen breathing during surface intervals reduces the time to fly by a factor of seven to nine times compared with air. A study by another military organization, the Special Operations Command also indicated that preflight oxygen might be an effective means for reducing DCS risk.

Some places, (for example, the Altiplano in Peru and Bolivia, or the plateau around Asmara (where the airport is) in Eritrea, and some mountain passes), are many thousand feet above sea level and travelling to such places after diving at lower altitude should be treated as flying at the equivalent altitude after diving. The available data does not cover flights which land at an altitude above 8,000 feet (2,400 m). These may be considered to be equivalent to flying at the same cabin altitude.

Training sessions in a pool of limited depth are usually outside the criteria requiring a pre-flight surface interval. The US Navy air decompression tables allow flying with a cabin altitude of 8000 feet for repetitive group C, which results from a bottom time of 61 to 88 minutes at a depth of 15 feet (4.6 m), or a bottom time of 102 to 158 minutes at a depth of 10 feet (3.0 m). Any pool session that does not exceed these depth and time combinations can be followed by a flight without any requirement for a delay. There would also be no restrictions on flying after diving with an oxygen rebreather, as inert gases are flushed out during oxygen breathing.

== Technical diving ==
Technical diving includes profiles that are relatively short and deep, and which are inefficient in terms of decompression time for a given bottom time. They also often lie outside the range of profiles with validated decompression schedules, and tend to use algorithms developed for other types of diving, often extrapolated to depths for which no formal testing has been done. Often modifications are made to produce shorter or safer decompression schedules, but the evidence relevant to these modifications is often difficult to locate when it exists. The widespread belief that bubble algorithms and other modifications which produce deeper stops are more efficient than the dissolved phase models is not borne out by formal experimental data, which suggest that the incidence of decompression symptoms may be higher for same duration schedules using deeper stops, due to greater saturation of slower tissues over the deeper profile.

== Specialised decompression procedures ==
=== Gas switching ===
It appears that gas switching from mixtures based on helium to nitrox during ascent does not accelerate decompression in comparison with dives using only helium diluent, but there is some evidence that the type of symptoms displayed is skewed towards neurological in heliox only dives. There is also some evidence that heliox to nitrox switches are implicated in inner ear decompression sickness which occurs during decompression. Suggested strategies to minimise risk of vestibular DCS are to ensure adequate initial decompression, and to make the switch to nitrox at a relatively shallow depth (less than 30 m), while using the highest acceptably safe oxygen fraction during decompression at the switch.

Deep technical diving usually involves the use of several breathing gas mixtures during the course of the dive. There will be a mixture known as the bottom gas, which is optimised for limiting inert gas narcosis and oxygen toxicity during the deep sector of the dive. This is generally the mixture which is needed in the largest amount for open circuit diving, as the consumption rate will be greatest at maximum depth. The oxygen fraction of the bottom gas suitable for a dive deeper than about 65 metres (213 ft) will not have sufficient oxygen to reliably support consciousness at the surface, so a travel gas must be carried to start the dive and get down to the depth at which the bottom gas is appropriate. There is generally a large overlap of depths where either gas can be used, and the choice of the point at which the switch will be made depends on considerations of cumulative toxicity, narcosis and gas consumption logistics specific to the planned dive profile.

During ascent, there will be one or more depths at which the diver may switch to a gas with a higher oxygen fraction, which will also accelerate decompression. If the travel gas is suitable, it can be used for decompression too, and it is a common choice for the first decompression gas. Additional oxygen rich decompression gas mixtures may be selected to optimise decompression times at shallower depths. These will usually be selected as soon as the partial pressure of oxygen is acceptable, to minimise required decompression, and there may be more than one such mixture depending on the planned decompression schedule. The shallowest stops may be done breathing pure oxygen. During prolonged decompression at high oxygen partial pressures, it may be advisable to take what is known as air breaks, where the diver switches back to a low oxygen fraction gas (usually bottom gas or travel gas) for a short period (usually about 5 minutes) to reduce the risk of developing oxygen toxicity symptoms, before continuing with the high oxygen fraction accelerated decompression. These multiple gas switches require the diver to select and use the correct demand valve and cylinder for each switch, and if using a dive computer, to select the correct gas from the gas menu at each switch. An error of selection could compromise the decompression, or result in a loss of consciousness due to oxygen toxicity or hypoxia.

The diver is faced with a problem of optimising for gas volume carried, number of different gases carried, depths at which switches can be made, bottom time, decompression time, gases available for emergency use, and at which depths they become available, both for themself and other members of the team, while using available cylinders and remaining able to manage the cylinders during the dive. This problem can be simplified if staging the cylinders is possible. This is the practice of leaving a cylinder at a point on the return route where it can be picked up and used, possibly depositing the previously used cylinder, which will be retrieved later, or having a support diver supply additional gas. These strategies rely on the diver being reliably able to get to the staged gas supply. The staged cylinders are usually clipped off to the distance line or shotline to make them easier to find.

==== Management of multiple cylinders ====
When multiple cylinders containing different gas mixtures are carried, the diver must ensure that the correct gas is breathed for the depth and stage of the dive. Breathing a gas with inappropriate oxygen partial pressure risks loss of consciousness and compromising the decompression plan. When switching, the diver must be certain of the composition of the new gas, and make the correct adjustments to decompression computer settings. Various systems have been used to identify the gas, the demand valve, and the source cylinder. One in general use and found by experience to be reliable, is to clearly label the cylinder with the maximum operating depth of the contents, as this is the most critical information, carry the demand valve on the cylinder, and leave the cylinder valve closed when the cylinder is not in use. This allows the diver to visually identify the mix as suitable for the current depth, select the demand valve at the cylinder, and confirm that it is the demand valve from that cylinder by opening the cylinder valve to release the gas. After the mix is confirmed and in use, the diver will switch over the computer to select the current gas from the menu, so that decompression computation can remain correct.

It is not unusual for deep technical dives to require three or four gas mixtures in addition to bottom gas, which is generally carried in back-mounted cylinders. There is a convention to carry the most oxygen-rich additional gases on the right side, and the lower oxygen fraction gases on the left side. This practice reduces the chances of confusion at depth and in poor visibility, and saves a little time when looking for the correct gas. Several models of technical dive computer can be set before the dive with the gas mixtures to be used, and will indicate when one of them is more suitable for the current depth than the gas in use. Some models of gas-integrated dive computer will detect which cylinder is in use by a change in content pressure transmitted via the pressure transmitter mounted on the regulator on that cylinder, and will automatically switch to the gas setting associated with that specific regulator's pressure transmitter.

=== Surface decompression ===
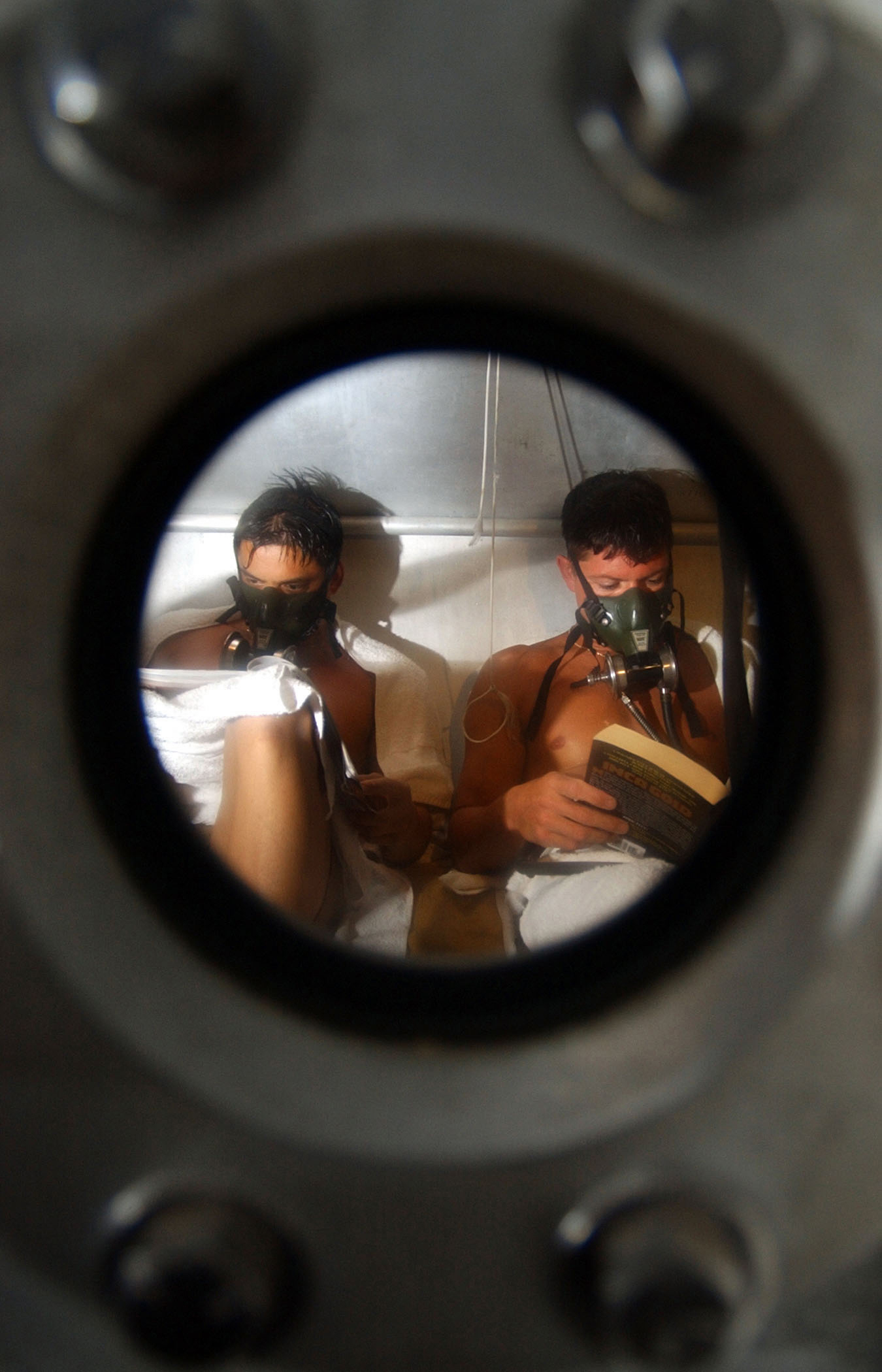
Divers breathing oxygen during surface decompression in the chamber after a 240 feet (73 m) dive

Surface decompression is a procedure in which some or all of the staged decompression obligation is done in a decompression chamber instead of in the water. This reduces the time that the diver spends in the water, exposed to environmental hazards such as cold water or currents, which improves diver safety and comfort. The decompression in the chamber is more controlled, in a more comfortable environment, and oxygen can be used at greater partial pressure as there is no risk of drowning and a lower risk of oxygen toxicity convulsions. A further operational advantage is that once the divers are in the chamber, new divers can be supplied from the diving panel, and the operations can continue with less delay.

A typical surface decompression procedure is described in the US Navy Diving Manual. If there is no in-water 40 ft stop required the diver is surfaced directly. Otherwise, all required decompression up to and including the 40 ft (12 m) stop is completed in-water. The diver is then surfaced and pressurised in a chamber to 50 fsw (15 msw) within 5 minutes of leaving 40 ft depth in the water. If this "surface interval" from 40 ft in the water to 50 fsw in the chamber exceeds 5 minutes, a penalty is incurred, as this indicates a higher risk of DCS symptoms developing, so longer decompression is required.

In the case where the diver is successfully recompressed within the nominal interval, he will be decompressed according to the schedule in the air decompression tables for surface decompression, preferably on oxygen, which is used from 50 fsw (15 msw), a partial pressure of 2.5 bar. The duration of the 50 fsw stop is 15 minutes for the Revision 6 tables. The chamber is then decompressed to 40 fsw (12 msw) for the next stage of up to 4 periods on oxygen. A stop may also be done at 30 fsw (9 msw), for further periods on oxygen according to the schedule. Air breaks of 5 minutes are taken at the end of each 30 minutes of oxygen breathing.

Surface decompression procedures have been described as "semi-controlled accidents".

Data collected in the North Sea have shown that the overall incidence of decompression sickness for in-water and surface decompression is similar, but surface decompression tends to produce ten times more type II (neurological) DCS than in-water decompression. A possible explanation is that during the final stage of ascent, bubbles are produced that are stopped in the lung capillaries. During recompression of the diver in the deck chamber, the diameter of some of these bubbles is reduced sufficiently that they pass through the pulmonary capillaries and reach the systemic circulation on the arterial side, later lodging in systemic capillaries and causing neurological symptoms. The same scenario was proposed for type II DCS recorded after sawtooth profile diving or multiple repetitive diving.

=== Closed bell decompression ===
"Dry", or "Closed" diving bells are pressure vessels for human occupation which can be deployed from the surface to transport divers to the underwater workplace at pressures greater than ambient. They are equalized to ambient pressure at the depth where the divers will get out and back in after the dive, and are then re-sealed for transport back to the surface, which also generally takes place with controlled internal pressure greater than ambient. During and/or after the recovery from depth, the divers may be decompressed in the same way as if they were in a decompression chamber, so in effect, the dry bell is a mobile decompression chamber. Another option, used in saturation diving, is to decompress to storage pressure (pressure in the habitat part of the saturation spread) and then transfer the divers to the saturation habitat under pressure (transfer under pressure – TUP), where they will stay until the next shift, or until decompressed at the end of the saturation period.

=== Saturation decompression ===
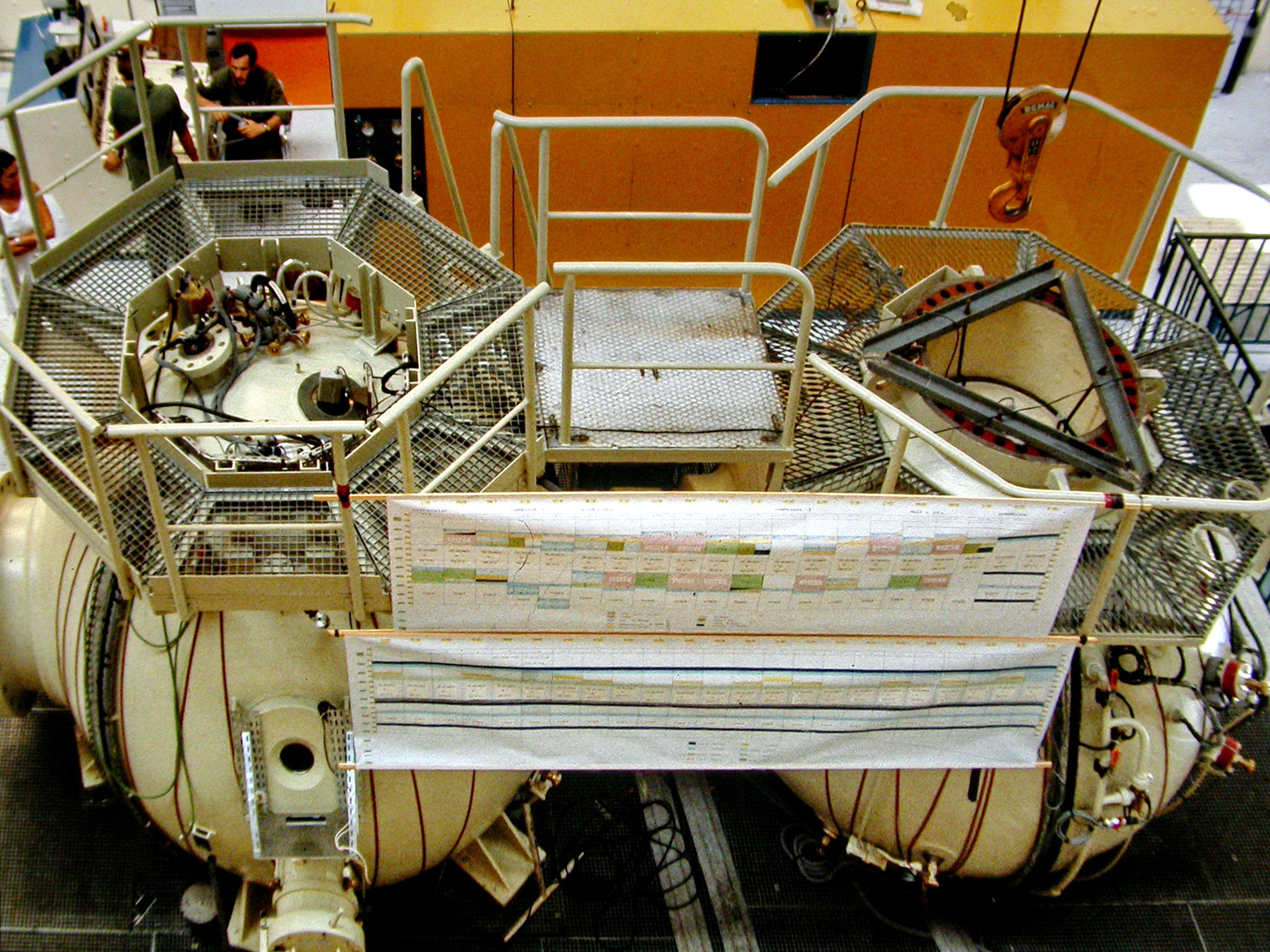
Part of a saturation system

Once all the tissue compartments have reached saturation for a given pressure and breathing mixture, continued exposure will not increase the gas loading of the tissues. From this point onwards the required decompression remains the same and is controlled by the slowest tissue. If divers work and live at pressure for a long period, and are decompressed only at the end of the period, the risks associated with decompression are limited to this single exposure. This principle has led to the practice of saturation diving, and as there is only one decompression, and it is done in the relative safety and comfort of a saturation habitat, the decompression is done on a very conservative profile, minimising the risk of bubble formation, growth and the consequent injury to tissues. A consequence of these procedures is that saturation divers are more likely to suffer decompression sickness symptoms in the slowest tissues, whereas bounce divers are more likely to develop bubbles in faster tissues.

Decompression from a saturation dive is a slow process. The rate of decompression typically ranges between 3 and 6 fsw (0.9 and 1.8 msw) per hour.

US Navy Heliox Saturation Decompression Table
Depth range	Ascent rate
1600 to 200 fsw	6 fsw per hour
200 to 100 fsw	5 fsw per hour
100 to 50 fsw	4 fsw per hour
50 to 0 fsw	3 fsw per hour

The US Navy Heliox saturation decompression rates require a partial pressure of oxygen to be maintained at between 0.44 and 0.48 atm when possible, but not to exceed 23% by volume, to restrict the risk of fire. For practicality the decompression is done in increments of 1 fsw at a rate not exceeding 1 fsw per minute, followed by a stop, with the average complying with the table ascent rate. Decompression is done for 16 hours in 24, with the remaining 8 hours split into two rest periods. A further adaptation generally made to the schedule is to stop at 4 fsw for the time that it would theoretically take to complete the decompression at the specified rate, i.e. 80 minutes, and then complete the decompression to surface at 1 fsw per minute. This is done to avoid the possibility of losing the door seal at a low pressure differential and losing the last hour or so of slow decompression.

The Norwegian saturation decompression tables are similar, but specifically do not allow decompression to start with an upward excursion. Partial pressure of oxygen is maintained between 0.4 and 0.5 bar, and a rest stop of 6 hours is specified each night starting at midnight.

Graphic representation of the NORSOK U-100 (2009) saturation decompression schedule from 180 msw, starting at 06h00 and taking 7 days, 15 hours

Norwegian standards saturation decompression table
Depth range	Ascent rate	Ascent rate
180 to 60 msw	40 minutes/msw	27 msw/day
60 to 30 msw	50 minutes/msw	21,6 msw/day
30 to 15 msw	60 minutes/msw	18 msw/day
15 to 0 msw	80 minutes/msw	13,5 msw/day

==== Emergency decompression from saturation ====
Very little is known with confidence about how best to decompress from saturation in an emergency. A DMAC consensus document has been issued with tentative advice on possible procedures based on a balance of perceived risk. These procedures are not supported by experience or experimental work as there is very little of either, and constitute an educated guess at best. The risk of symptomatic decompression sickness is expected to increase as the rate of decompression increases, with earlier pain only symptoms, and more serious symptoms developing later or at higher decompression rates. A relatively high partial pressure of oxygen is considered likely to increase the rate of safe outgassing, but at a higher risk of oxygen toxicity.

=== Therapeutic decompression ===
Therapeutic decompression is a procedure for treating decompression sickness by recompressing the diver, thus reducing bubble size, and allowing the gas bubbles to re-dissolve, then decompressing slowly enough to avoid further formation or growth of bubbles, or eliminating the inert gases by breathing oxygen under pressure.

==== Therapeutic decompression on air ====
Recompression on atmospheric air was shown to be an effective treatment for minor DCS symptoms by Keays in 1909.

Historically, therapeutic decompression was done by recompressing the diver to the depth of relief of pain, or a bit deeper, maintaining that pressure for a while, so that bubbles could be re-dissolved, and performing a slow decompression back to the surface pressure. Later air tables were standardised to specific depths, followed by slow decompression. This procedure has been superseded almost entirely by hyperbaric oxygen treatment.

==== Hyperbaric oxygen therapy ====
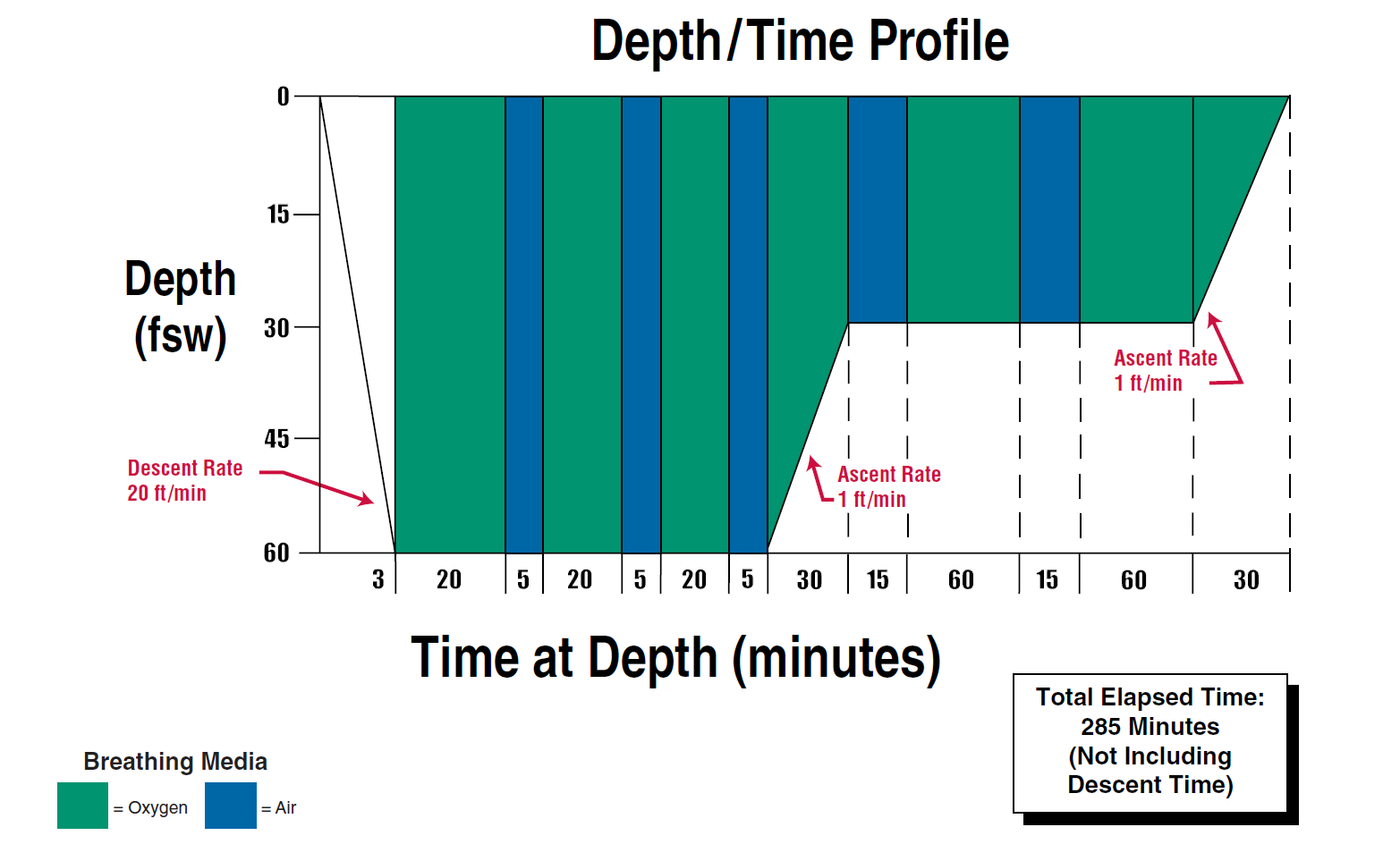
US Navy Treatment Table 6

Evidence of the effectiveness of recompression therapy utilizing oxygen was first shown by Yarbrough and Behnke (1939), and has since become the standard of care for treatment of DCS.

A typical hyperbaric oxygen treatment schedule is the US Navy Table 6, which provides for a standard treatment of 3 to 5 periods of 20 minutes of oxygen breathing at 60 fsw (18msw) followed by 2 to 4 periods of 60 minutes at 30 fsw (9 msw) before surfacing. Air breaks are taken between oxygen breathing to reduce the risk of oxygen toxicity.

==== In-water recompression ====
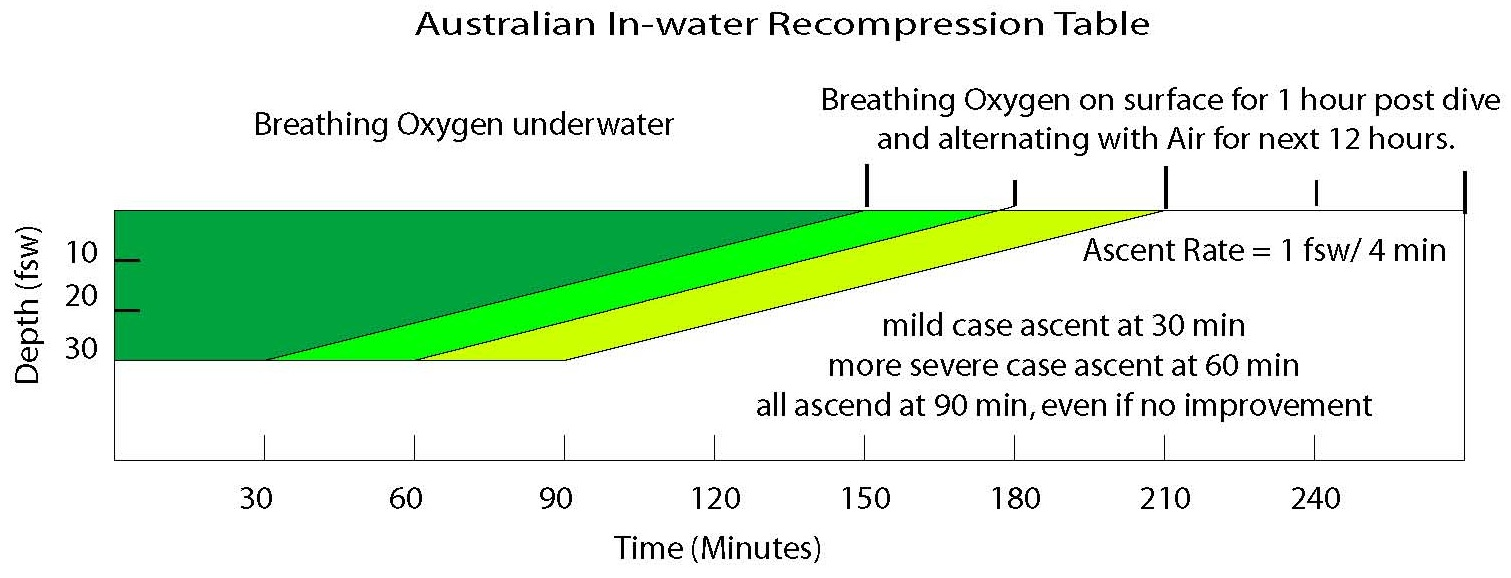
There are several published IWR tables, this one is from the Royal Australian Navy

If a chamber is not available for recompression within a reasonable period, a riskier alternative is in-water recompression at the dive site. In-water recompression (IWR) is the emergency treatment of decompression sickness (DCS) by sending the diver back underwater to allow the gas bubbles in the tissues, which are causing the symptoms, to resolve. It is a risky procedure that should only be used when it is not practicable to travel to the nearest recompression chamber in time to save the victim's life. The principle behind in-water recompression treatment is the same as that behind the treatment of DCS in a recompression chamber

The procedure is high risk as a diver suffering from DCS may become paralysed, unconscious or stop breathing whilst under water. Any one of these events may result in the diver drowning or further injury to the diver during a subsequent rescue to the surface. These risks can be mitigated to some extent by using a helmet or full-face mask with voice communications on the diver, suspending the diver from the surface so that depth is positively controlled, and by having an in-water standby diver attend the diver undergoing the treatment at all times.

Although in-water recompression is regarded as risky, and to be avoided, there is increasing evidence that technical divers who surface and develop mild DCS symptoms may often get back into the water and breathe pure oxygen at a depth of 20 feet (6.1 m) for a period to seek to alleviate the symptoms. This trend is noted in paragraph 3.6.5 of DAN's 2008 accident report. The report also notes that while the reported incidents showed very little success, "[w]e must recognize that these calls were mostly because the attempted IWR failed. In case the IWR were successful, [the] diver would not have called to report the event. Thus we do not know how often IWR may have been used successfully."

Historically, in-water recompression was the usual method of treating decompression sickness in remote areas. Procedures were often informal and based on operator experience, and used air as the breathing gas as it was all that was available. The divers generally used standard diving gear, which was relatively safe for this procedure, as the diver was at low risk of drowning if he lost consciousness.

=== Oxygen prebreathing ===
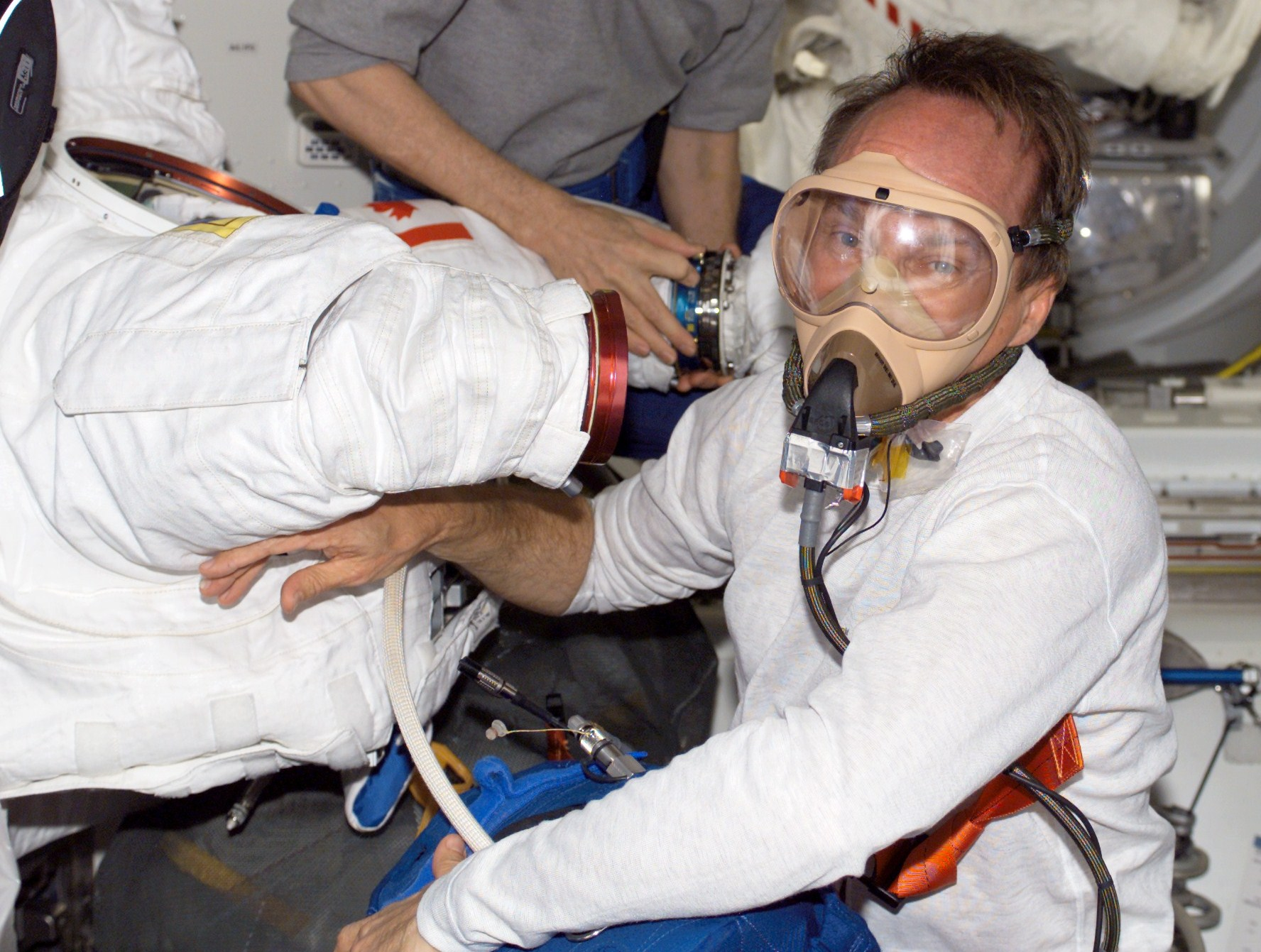
Astronaut Steven G. MacLean pre-breathes prior to an EVA

Oxygen prebreathing is a procedure used to reduce the risk of decompression sickness before a hypobaric exposure to a pressure where the risk is significant. It is used in military aviation before flights to high altitudes, and in spaceflight before extravehicular activity in space suits with a relatively low working internal pressure.

When space suits with an operating pressure less than about 55 kPa absolute are used from craft that are pressurized to normal atmospheric pressure (such as the Space Shuttle), this requires astronauts to "pre-breathe" pure oxygen for a period before donning their suits and depressurizing in the air lock. This procedure purges the body of dissolved nitrogen, so as to avoid decompression sickness due to rapid depressurization from a nitrogen-containing atmosphere.

In the US space shuttle, cabin pressure was reduced from normal atmospheric to 70kPa, equivalent to an altitude of about 3000m, for 24 hours before EVA, and after donning the suit, a pre-breathing period of 45 minutes on pure oxygen before decompressing to the EMU working pressure of 30kPa. In the International Space Station, there is no cabin pressure reduction; instead a 4 hour pre-breathe of oxygen at normal cabin pressure is used to desaturate nitrogen to an acceptable level. US studies show that a rapid decompression from 101 kPa to 55 kPa has an acceptable risk, and Russian studies show that direct decompression from 101 kPa to 40 kPa after 30 minutes of oxygen pre-breathing, roughly the time required for pre-EVA suit checks, is acceptable.

== Decompression equipment ==
There are several types of equipment used to help divers carry out decompression. Some are used to plan and monitor the decompression and some mark the underwater position of the diver and act as a buoyancy control aid and position reference in low visibility or currents. Decompression may be shortened (or accelerated) by breathing an oxygen-rich "deco gas" such as a nitrox with 50% or more oxygen. The high partial pressure of oxygen in such decompression mixes create the effect of the oxygen window. This decompression gas is often carried by scuba divers in side-slung cylinders. Cave divers who can only return by a single route, will often leave decompression gas cylinders attached to the guideline at the points where they will be used. Surface supplied divers will have the composition of the breathing gas controlled at the gas panel. Divers with long decompression obligations may be decompressed inside gas filled chambers in the water or at the surface.

=== Planning and monitoring decompression ===
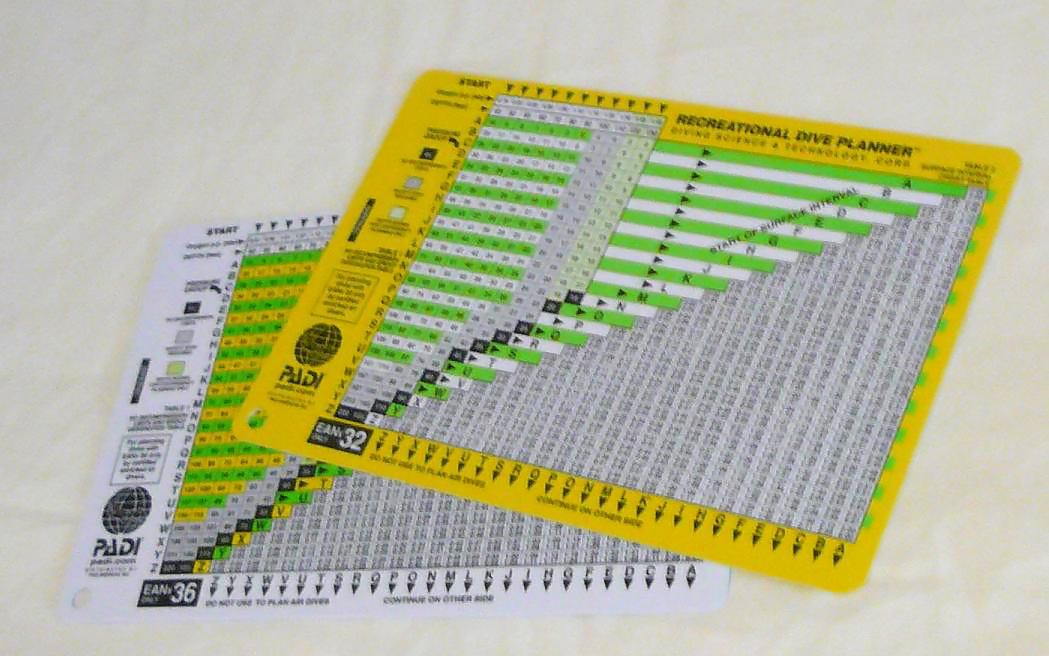
The PADI Nitrox tables are laid out in what has become a common format for no-stop recreational tables

Video: Setting the bezel of a diving watch to the start time (minute hand) of a dive at the beginning. Divers used this in conjunction with a depth gauge and a decompression table to calculate the remaining safe dive time (or required stops) during dives. This procedure was necessary for scuba diving until dive computers rendered it unnecessary.

Equipment for planning and monitoring decompression includes decompression tables, surface computer software and personal decompression computers. There is a wide range of choice:

- A decompression algorithm is used to calculate the decompression stops needed for a particular dive profile to reduce the risk of decompression sickness occurring during ascent and after surfacing at the end of a dive. The algorithm can be used to generate decompression schedules for a particular dive profile, decompression tables for more general use, or be implemented in dive computer software. Depending on the algorithm chosen the range of no-decompression limits at a given depth on the same gas can vary considerably. It is not possible to discriminate between "right" and "wrong" options, but it is considered correct to say that the risk of developing DCS is greater for the longer exposures and less for the shorter exposures for a given depth.
- Dive tables or decompression tables are tabulated data, often in the form of printed cards or booklets, that allow divers to determine a decompression schedule for a given dive profile and breathing gas. In some cases they may also specify an altitude range. The choice of tables for professional diving use is generally made by the organization employing the divers, and for recreational training it is usually prescribed by the certifying agency, but for recreational purposes the diver is generally free to make use of any of the range of published tables, and for that matter, to modify them to suit himself or herself. Acceptably safe and effective use of dive tables requires the diver to follow the schedule within a reasonable tolerance for ascent rate, depth and elapsed time at decompression stops. A diver's watch and accurate depth gauge were the original tools for this purpose, but have been largely superseded by electronic bottom timers or dive computers for scuba divers, though a stopwatch and pneumofathometer are still commonly used for monitoring ascent and decompression by surface supplied divers.
- Decompression software is available for personal computers and smartphones to model the decompression requirements of user specified dive profiles with different gas mixtures using a choice of decompression algorithms. Schedules generated by decompression software represent a diver's specific dive plan and breathing gas mixtures. It is usual to generate a schedule for the planned profile and for the most likely contingency profiles.
- A personal dive computer is a small computer designed to be worn by a diver during a dive, with a pressure sensor and an electronic timer mounted in a waterproof and pressure resistant housing which has been programmed to model the inert gas loading of the diver's tissues in real time during a dive. A display allows the diver to see critical data during the dive, including the maximum and current depth, duration of the dive, and decompression data including the remaining no decompression limit calculated in real time for the diver throughout the dive. The dive computer keeps track of residual gas loading for each tissue used in the algorithm. Dive computers also provide a measure of safety for divers who accidentally dive a different profile to that originally planned. Most dive computers will provide the necessary decompression information for acceptably safe ascent in the event that the no-decompression limits are exceeded. The use of computers to manage recreational (including technical) dive decompression is becoming the standard and their use is also common in occupational scientific diving. and military scuba on air and mixed gas. Their value in surface supplied commercial diving is more restricted, but they can usefully serve as dive profile recorders.

=== Controlling depth and ascent rate ===
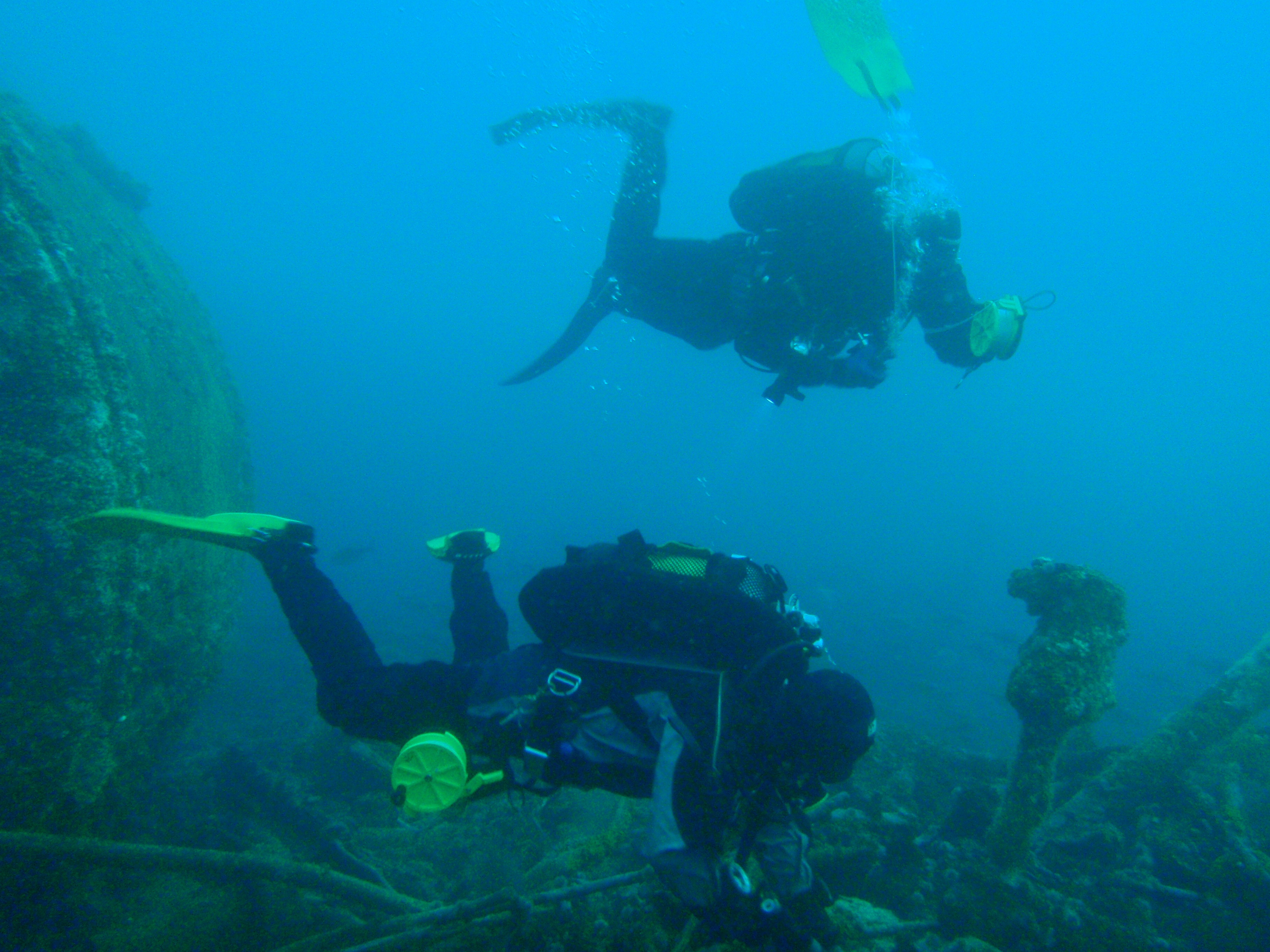
Diver deploying a surface marker buoy (DSMB)

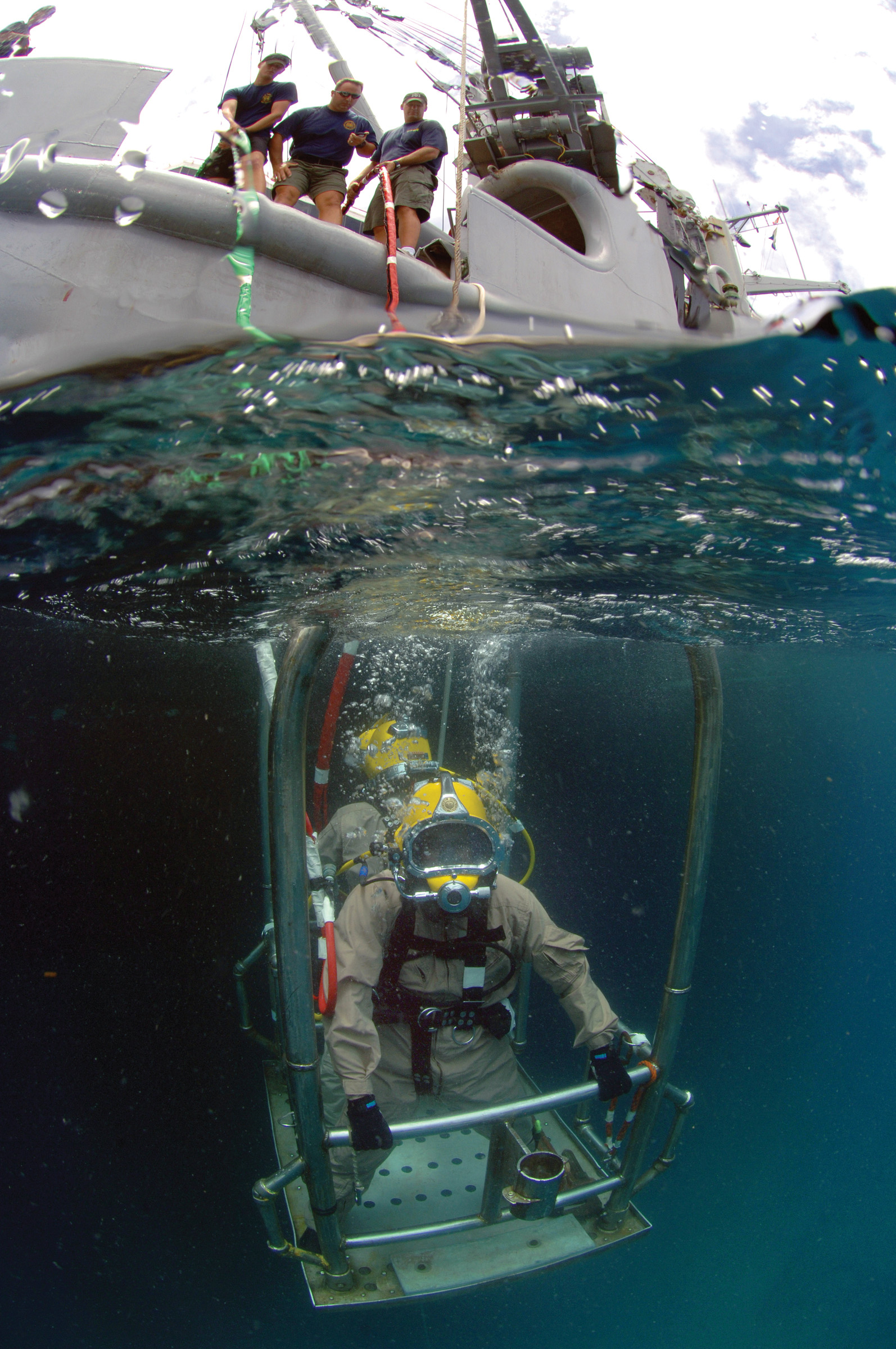
Surface supplied diver on diving stage

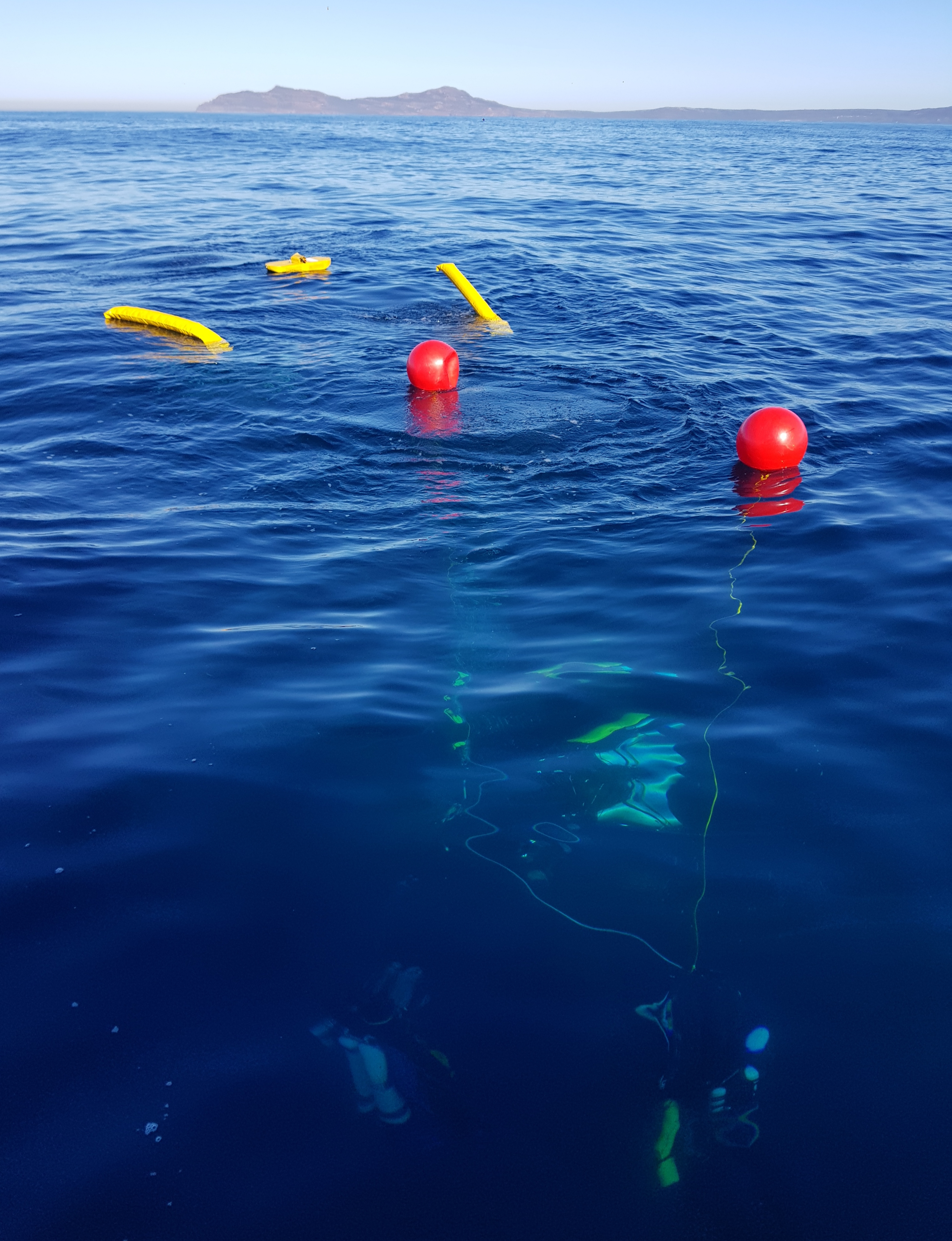
Divers decompressing at the trapeze which was lowered into the water when the second DSMB was deployed as a signal

A critical aspect of successful decompression is that the depth and ascent rate of the diver must be monitored and sufficiently accurately controlled. Practical in-water decompression requires a reasonable tolerance for variation in depth and rate of ascent, but unless the decompression is being monitored in real time by a decompression computer, any deviations from the nominal profile will affect the risk. Several items of equipment are used to assist in facilitating accurate adherence to the planned profile, by allowing the diver to more easily and accurately monitor and control depth and ascent rate, or to transfer this control to specialist personnel at the surface.

- A shot line is a rope between a float at the surface, and a sufficiently heavy weight holding the rope approximately vertical. The shot line float should be sufficiently buoyant to support the weight of all divers that are likely to be using it at the same time. Recreational divers are free to choose lesser buoyancy at their own risk. The shot weight should be sufficient to prevent a diver from lifting it from the bottom by over-inflation of the buoyancy compensator or dry suit, but not sufficient to sink the float if the slack on the line is all taken up. Various configurations of shot line are used to control the amount of slack. The diver ascends along the shotline, and may use it purely as a visual reference, or can hold on to it to positively control depth, or can climb up it hand over hand. A Jonline may be used to fasten a diver to a shotline during a decompression stop.
- A decompression trapeze or decompression bar is a device used in recreational diving and technical diving to make decompression stops more comfortable and more secure and provide the divers' surface cover with a visual reference for the divers' position. It consists of a horizontal bar or bars suspended at the depth of intended decompression stops by buoys. The bars are of sufficient weight and the buoys of sufficient buoyancy that the trapeze will not easily change depth in turbulent water or if the divers experience buoyancy control problems. A decompression trapeze can be tethered to a shotline, or to the dive boat, or allowed to drift with the divers. It is effective for keeping a group of divers together during long decompression stops and in poor visibilty.
- A surface marker buoy (SMB) with a reel and line is often used by a dive leader to allow the boat to monitor progress of the dive group. This can provide the operator with a positive control of depth, by remaining slightly negative and using the buoyancy of the float to support this slight over-weighting. This allows the line to be kept under slight tension which reduces the risk of entanglement. The reel or spool used to store and roll up the line usually has slightly negative buoyancy, so that if released it will hang down and not float away.
- A decompression buoy, also called a delayed or deployable surface marker buoy (DSMB) is a soft inflatable tube which is attached to a reel or spool line at one end, and is inflated by the diver under water and released to float to the surface, deploying the line as it ascends. This provides information to the surface that the diver is about to ascend, and where he is. This equipment is commonly used by recreational and technical divers, and requires a certain level of skill to operate safely. They are mostly used to signal the boat that the diver has started ascent or to indicate a problem in technical diving.
- A diving stage, sometimes known as the basket, or diver launch and recovery system (LARS), is a platform on which one or two divers stand which is hoisted into the water, lowered to the workplace or the bottom, and then hoisted up again to return the diver to the surface and lift him out of the water. This equipment is almost exclusively used by surface supplied professional divers, as it requires fairly complex lifting equipment. A diving stage allows the surface team to conveniently manage a diver's decompression as it can be hoisted at a controlled rate and stopped at the correct depth for decompression stops, and allows the divers to rest during the ascent. It also allows the divers to be relatively safely and conveniently lifted out of the water and returned to the deck or quayside.
- A wet bell, or open bell, is similar to a diving stage in concept, but has an air space, open to the water at the bottom in which the divers, or at least their heads, can shelter during ascent and descent.

=== Providing gases to accelerate decompression ===
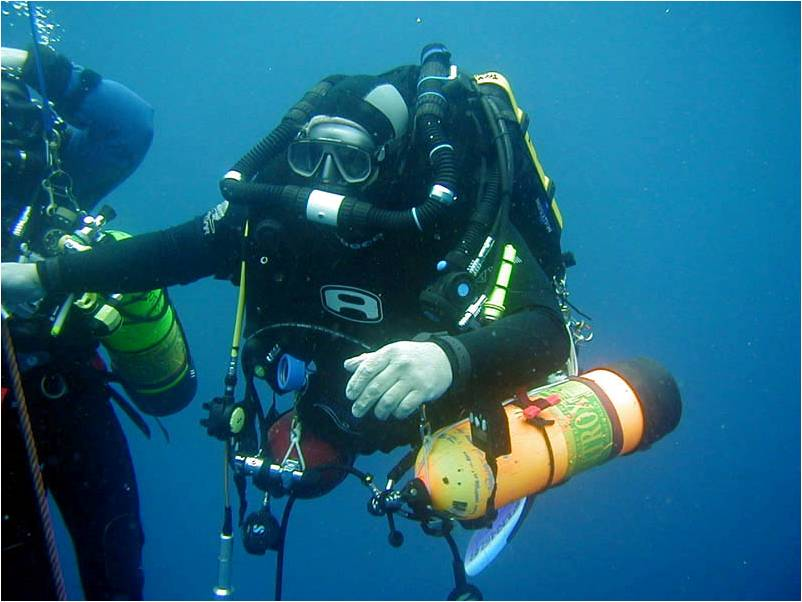
Rebreather diver with bailout and decompression cylinders

Reducing the partial pressure of the inert gas component of the breathing mixture will accelerate decompression as the concentration gradient will be greater for a given depth. This is usually achieved by increasing the partial pressure of oxygen in the breathing gas, as substituting a different inert gas may have counter-diffusion complications due to differing rates of diffusion, which can lead to a net gain in total dissolved gas tension in a tissue. This can lead to bubble formation and growth, with decompression sickness as a consequence. Partial pressure of oxygen is usually limited to 1.6 bar during in-water decompression for scuba divers, but can be up to 1.9 bar in-water and 2.2 bar in the chamber when using the US Navy tables for surface decompression.

- Stage cylinders are cylinders which are stored by scuba divers along the return route containing decompression and emergency gas. This is only practicable where the return route is known and marked by a guideline. Similar cylinders are carried by the divers when the route back is not secure. They are commonly mounted as sling cylinders, clipped to D-rings at the sides of the diver's harness. The divers must avoid breathing oxygen enriched "deco gas" at excessive depths because of the high risk of oxygen toxicity. To prevent this happening, cylinders containing oxygen-rich gases must always be positively identifiable. One way of doing this is by marking them with their maximum operating depth as clearly as possible.
- Surface supplied divers may be supplied with a gas mixture suitable for accelerated decompression by connecting a supply to the surface gas panel and providing it through the umbilical to the divers. This allows accelerated decompression, usually on oxygen, which can be used to a maximum depth of 30 ft (9 m). Surface supplied heliox bounce divers will be provided with mixtures suitable for their current depth, and the mixture may be changed several times during descent and ascent from great depths.
- Closed circuit rebreathers are usually controlled to provide a fairly constant partial pressure of oxygen during the dive (set point), and may be reset to a richer mix for decompression. The effect is to keep the partial pressure of inert gases as low as safely practicable throughout the dive. This minimizes the absorption of inert gas in the first place, and accelerates the elimination of the inert gases during ascent.

=== Surface decompression ===
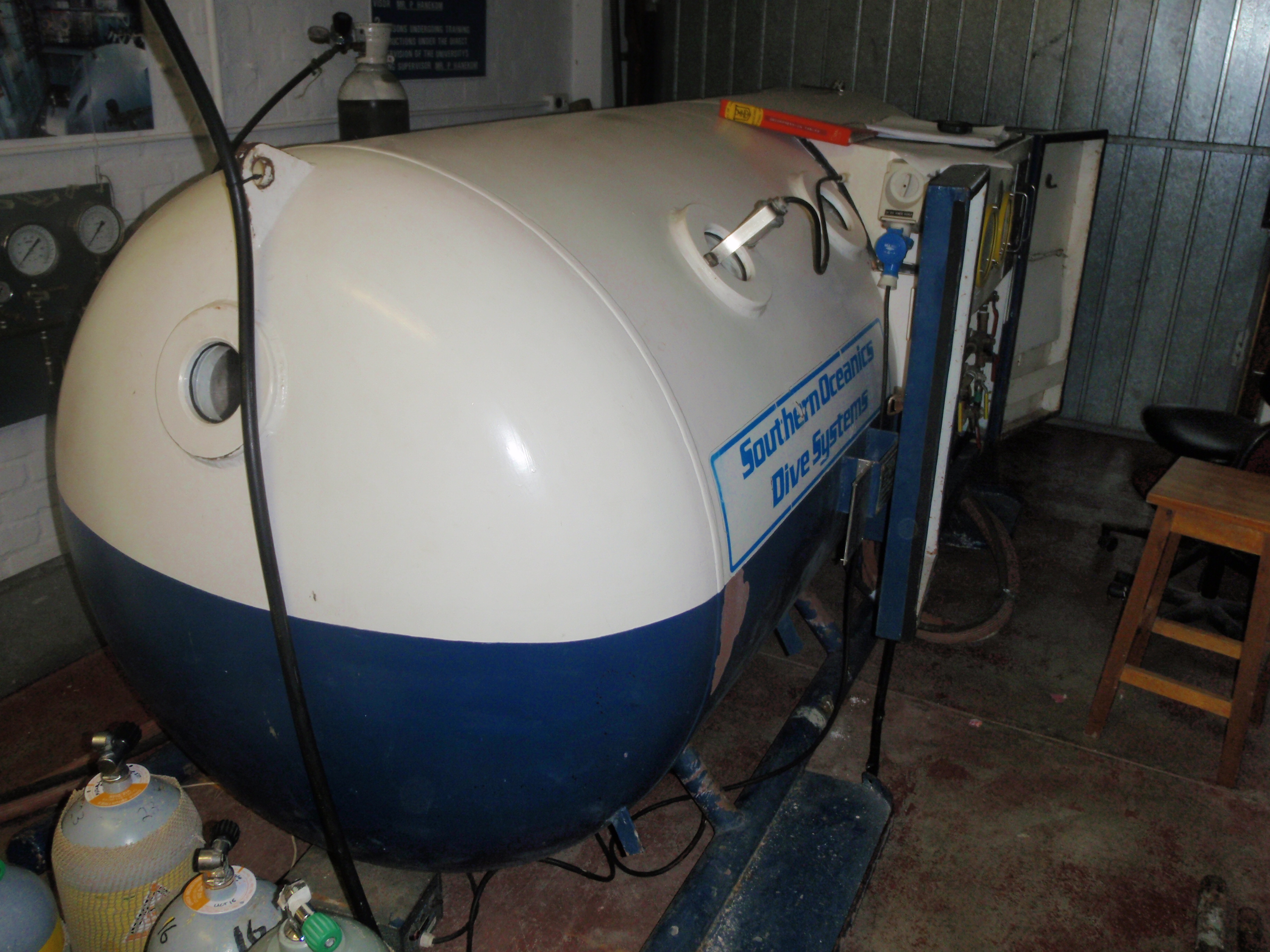
A basic deck decompression chamber

Specialised equipment is available to decompress a diver out of the water. This is almost exclusively used with surface supplied diving equipment:

- Deck decompression chambers are used for surface decompression, described in a previous section. Most deck decompression chambers are fitted with built in breathing systems (BIBS), which supply an alternative breathing gas to the occupants (usually oxygen), and discharge the exhaled gas outside the chamber, so the chamber gas is not excessively enriched by oxygen, which would cause an unacceptable fire hazard, and require frequent flushing with chamber gas (usually air).

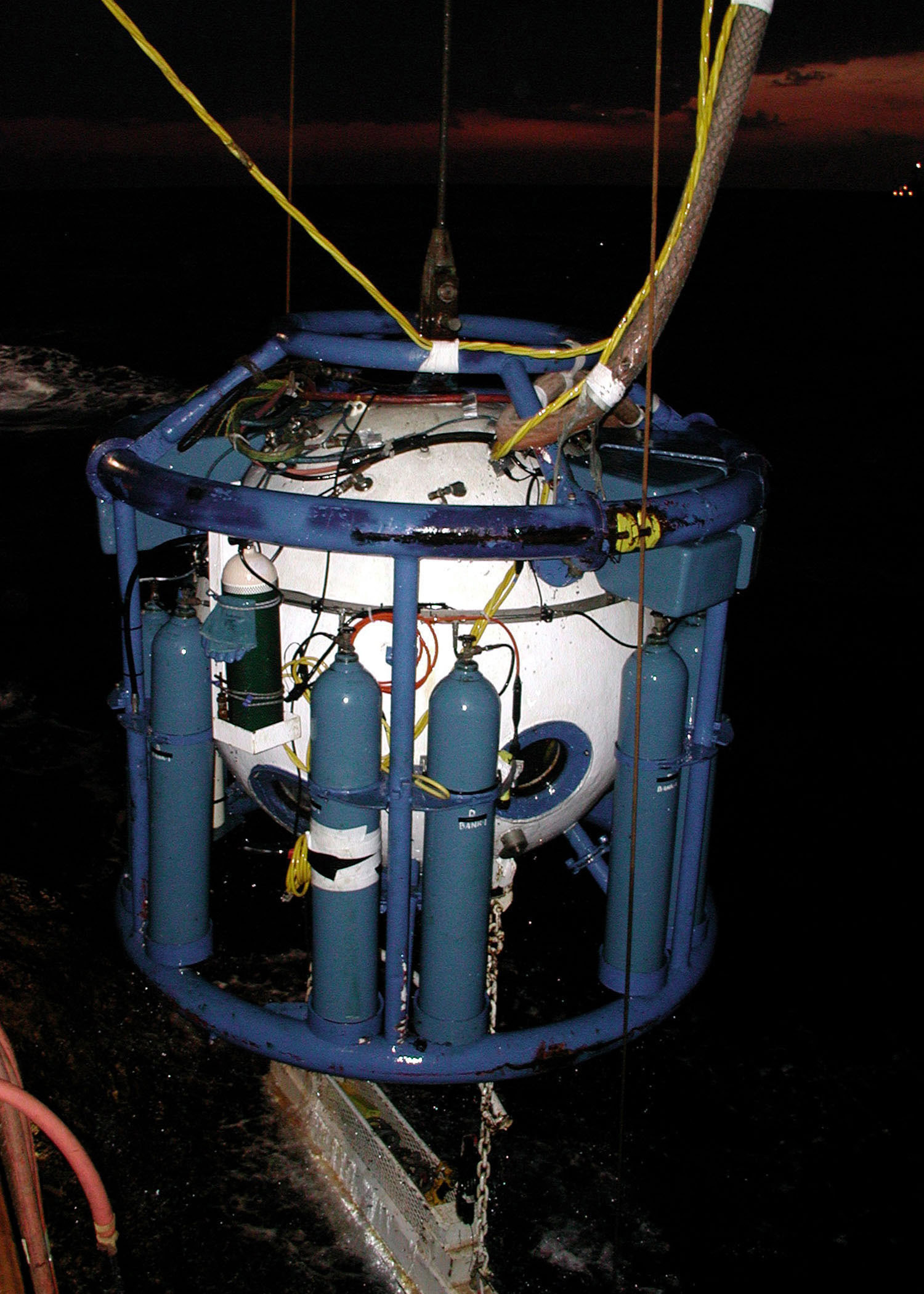
Personnel Transfer Capsule.

- A dry bell may be used for bounce dives to great depths, and then used as the decompression chamber during the ascent and later on board the support vessel. In this case it is not always necessary to transfer into a deck chamber, as the bell is quite capable of performing this function, though it would be relatively cramped, as a bell is usually as small as conveniently possible to minimize weight for deployment.
- A Saturation system or saturation spread typically comprises at minimum a living chamber, transfer chamber and submersible decompression chamber, which is commonly referred to in commercial diving as the diving bell and in military diving as the personnel transfer capsule, PTC (Personnel Transfer Capsule) or SDC (Submersible Decompression Chamber). The diving bell is the elevator or lift that transfers divers from the system to the work site and back. At the completion of work or a mission, the saturation diving team is decompressed gradually back to atmospheric pressure by the slow venting of system pressure, at rates of about of 15 metres (49 ft) to 30 metres (98 ft) per day, (schedules vary). Thus the process involves only one ascent, thereby mitigating the time-consuming and comparatively risky process of multiple decompressions normally associated with multiple non-saturation ("bounce diving") operations.
- A hyperbaric lifeboat or hyperbaric rescue unit may be provided for emergency evacuation of saturation divers from a saturation system. This would be used if the platform is at immediate risk due to fire or sinking, and allows the divers under saturation to get clear of the immediate danger. The crew would normally start decompression as soon as reasonably practicable after launching.

== Risk management ==
Risk management for decompression sickness involves following decompression schedules of known and acceptable risk, providing mitigation in the event of a hit (diving term indicating symptomatic decompression sickness), and reducing risk to an acceptable level by following recommended practice and avoiding deprecated practice to the extent considered appropriate by the responsible person and the divers involved. The risk of decompression sickness for the algorithms in common use is not always accurately known. Human testing under controlled conditions with the end condition of symptomatic decompression sickness is no longer frequently carried out for ethical reasons. A considerable amount of self-experimentation is done by technical divers, but conditions are generally not optimally recorded, and there are usually several unknowns, and no control group. Several practices are recommended to reduce risk based on theoretical arguments, but the value of many of these practices in reducing risk is uncertain, particularly in combinations. The vast majority of professional and recreational diving is done under low risk conditions and without recognised symptoms, but in spite of this there are occasionally unexplained incidences of decompression sickness. The earlier tendency to blame the diver for not properly following the procedures has been shown to not only be counterproductive, but sometimes factually wrong, and it is now generally recognised that there is statistically a small but real risk of symptomatic decompression sickness for even highly conservative profiles. This acceptance by the diving community that sometimes one is simply unlucky encourages more divers to report borderline cases, and the statistics gathered may provide more complete and precise indications of risk as they are analysed.

=== Conservatism ===
Decompression conservatism refers to the application of factors to a basic decompression algorithm or set of tables that are expected to decrease the risk of developing symptomatic decompression sickness when following a given dive profile. This practice has a long history, originating with the practice of decompressing according to the tables for a dive deeper than the actual depth, longer than the actual bottom time, or both. These practices were empirically developed by divers and supervisors to account for factors that they considered increased risk, such as hard work during the dive, or cold water. With the development of computer programs to calculate decompression schedules for specified dive profiles, came the possibility of adjusting the allowed percentage of the maximum supersaturation (M-values). This feature became available in dive computers as an optional personal setting in addition to any conservatism added by the manufacturer, and the range of base conservatism set by manufacturers is large.

Conservatism also varies between decompression algorithms due to the different assumptions and mathematical models used. In this case the conservatism is considered relative, as in most cases the validity of the model remains open to question, and has been adjusted empirically to produce a statistically acceptable risk by the designers. Where the depth, pressure and gas mixture exposure on a dive is outside of the experimentally tested range, the risk is unknown, and conservatism of adjustments to the allowable theoretical tissue gas load is relative to an unknown risk.

The application of user conservatism for dive computers varies considerably. The general tendency in dive computers intended for the recreational market is to provide one or two preset conservatism settings which have the effect of reducing allowed no-decompression limit in a way which is not transparent to the user. Technical divers, who are required to have a deeper understanding of the theoretical basis of decompression algorithms, often want to be able to set conservatism as an informed choice, and technical computers often provide this option. For the popular Bühlmann algorithm, it is usually in the form of gradient factors. In some cases the computer may provide a readout of the current computed percentage of the M-value in real time, as an aid to managing a situation where the diver must balance decompression risk against other risks to make the ascent.

The converse of conservative decompression is termed aggressive decompression. This may be used to minimise in-water time for exceptional exposure dives by divers willing to accept the unknown personal risk associated with the practice. A choice of reduced conservatism may also be used by more risk averse divers in a situation where the apparent decompression risk is perceived to be less dire than other possible consequences, such as drowning due to running out of breathing gas, development of debilitating hypothermia, seriously deteriorating water and weather conditions, a medical emergency, or imminent shark attack. Some dive computers allow for these types of contingencies by allowing the diver to adjust gradient factors during the dive, or optionally displaying the limiting tissue surfacing gradient factor for immediate surfacing without further decompression (Surfacing GF on Shearwater computers). This facility can allow the diver to weigh up the relative risks as much as reasonably practicable and balance decompression risk against the other risks.

=== Recommended practices ===
Practices for which there is some evidence or theoretical model suggesting that they may reduce risk of decompression sickness:

- Extended decompression: Providing that the depth is shallow enough that effectively no further inert gas tissue loading will occur, more decompression time will reduce the risk of decompression sickness, but with diminishing returns. In practice this can be facilitated by using two decompression computers. One is set at the least conservative setting acceptable to the diver, and is used to indicate minimum acceptable decompression and time to surface. The other is set at a conservatism which the diver considers adequate and low risk. Decompression will normally be done following the conservative setting, but if circumstances suggest getting out of the water sooner, the less conservative computer will show when the risk is at least acceptably low.
- Rehydration: Excessive hydration before a dive can increase the risk of immersion pulmonary oedema, but dehydration can develop during a dive due to blood shift to the core from immersion and peripheral vasoconstriction from chilling, and the natural tendency of the kidneys to eliminate what seems to be an excess. There is also a continuous water loss to breathing gas, particularly on open circuit, as the gas supplied on scuba is usually very dry. Rehydration after a dive is associated with a lower risk of decompression sickness and is helpful if symptoms develop.
- Mild exercise during decompression: Sufficient exercise to stimulate the circulation and maintain body temperature is thought to accelerate inert gas washout, therefore reducing the risk of decompression sickness for a given decompression schedule.
- Core temperature recovery
- Surface oxygen breathing: The use of oxygen or nitrox as a post dive breathing mixture is recommended in cases where incomplete decompression or short periods of omitted decompression have occurred, or at any time when there is doubt that decompression was sufficient.
- Low exertion during the ingassing stage of the dive: This reduces circulation during ingassing, so it will take longer for perfusion limited tissues to reach any specific inert gas loading. Consequently, the tissue loading at the end of the dive will be lower than if the diver worked hard. This is obviously not always possible, and may be logistically undesirable when there is a job to be done. Decompression algorithms assume and are tested at a high level of exertion, so the indicated decompression should be acceptably safe even when exertion is fairly intense. Less exertion will reduce the risk by an unknown amount.
- Maintaining physical fitness: Exercise to maintain physical fitness and exercise in the 24 hours previous to a dive may reduce risk of bubble formation during decompression.

=== Deprecated practices ===
Practices considered to either increase the risk of developing decompression sickness after diving, or for which there is theoretical risk, but insufficient data:

- Hot tubs, jacuzzis, showers or saunas after diving: Exposing the diver to a hot external environment immediately after diving will alter decompression stress. The net result may be good or bad depending on the inert gas load and the heat stress. Reheating a chilled or hypothermic diver can restore impaired circulation to the extremities. If the inert gas load is low, this may improve the rate of gas elimination, but larger inert gas loads might be pushed to the point of bubble formation or growth due to temperature effects on solubility. Which of these effects will predominate is unpredictable and may even vary in the same diver in a given instance. The warming of tissues precedes the increase in blood flow, so bubbles may become problematic before circulation can remove the gas. This risk is not amenable to numerical analysis and there are many variables. The risk is likely to reduce with the passage of time, lower gas loading, and higher initial temperatures of the extremities.
- Flying or ascent to altitude soon after diving: This is known to increase risk as it is in effect further decompression. There are specific recommendations to manage risk in such cases. In most cases they are equivalent to a long decompression stop on air at sea level ambient pressure before ascending to a higher altitude, to ensure that the controlling tissues are sufficiently desaturated. Several rules of thumb have been recommended over the years. These include waiting until one reaches a specific repetitive group, and simple surface intervals based on the recent diving history.
- Heavy exercise following diving: The risk is thought to be associated with an increased pulmonary shunt that allows venous blood and bubbles to bypass the lungs, allowing bubbles into the arterial system. Heavy exercise in the 4 hours following a recreational or technical dive may increase risk of bubble formation or shunts.
- Consumption of alcohol before and after diving: Alcohol can increase dehydration and heat loss, both considered risk factors for decompression sickness.
- Use of some drugs:
- Breathhold diving after scuba or surface supplied diving: Bubble formation is more likely after significant decompression stress, and the risk increases with residual inert gas load, so deeper freediving and more intense exercise will have a greater associated risk.
- Diving after long flights: Long distance flying tends to leave the traveller tired and somewhat dehydrated, which is thought to be a factor predisposing to DCS due to less efficient inert gas elimination. Statistics are insufficient to show cause and effect but about a third of decompression sickness incidents reported annually from the Caribbean occur after the first day's dives.
- Diving during pregnancy: The change in risk of decompression sickness during pregnancy is unknown, and it is considered unethical to conduct experiments with an endpoint of symptomatic decompression sickness in pregnant women, so data is unlikely to accumulate sufficiently to allow the risk to be assessed realistically. The precautionary principle suggests that the risk should be avoided by not diving when pregnant. A history of diving during early stages of pregnancy is not considered likely to have adverse effects on the fetus, but the recommendations are to avoid it.
- Diving while medically unfit to dive:
- Saw-tooth dive profile: In a saw tooth profile the diver ascends and descends a number of times during the dive. Each ascent and descent increases the risk of decompression sickness if there are any bubbles already in the diver's tissues. The increase in risk depends on the ascent rate, magnitude and duration of the upwards excursion, the saturation levels of the tissues, and to some extent the time spent after returning to depth. Accurate assessment of the increase of risk is not currently (2016) possible. Dive profiles with multiple complete or incomplete ascents are known to produce higher post-dive venous bubble counts, measured by Doppler ultrasound, than similar profiles at relatively constant depth.

=== Real time contingency management using a decompression computer ===
A consequence of using a decompression computer to monitor gas loading during a dive is that it becomes possible to adapt the dive plan during the dive, but it remains necessary to ensure that there is sufficient gas remaining to make the return to the surface with all necessary decompression while providing emergency gas for a buddy.

Tools for adapting the dive plan for contingencies during a dive are available on some technical diving computers. The primary change in dive planning was that the ascent profile became controlled by the computer for the actual decompression obligation of the dive up to and including the parts of the ascent already done.

Dive computers have become more reliable and more affordable, so it is fairly common for tech divers to have a backup computer. This reduces the risk of a computer failure during the dive necessitating an ascent controlled by depth gauge, timer and dive tables, and all the extra functionality and flexibility remains available to the diver. One of the options available is to set up the backup computer with different display settings and user options, but when these can be selected at any time during the dive, there is no great advantage provided the diver is sufficiently familiar with the device.

==== Deteriorating sea state ====
A deteriorating sea state can make depth control difficult. The most efficient elimination of inert gas occurs at a pressure gradient close to that which could cause bubble formation, at or just below the decompression ceiling. If it is difficult to reliably remain at the optimum depth, it is generally safer to descend to a depth where depth that reduces the risk of violating the ceiling, provided that depth still allows decompression at a rate which is compatible with the available gas supply. In such circumstances attempting to maintain neutral buoyancy can be heavy task loading and the use of a buoyed line is much more reliable. Enough negative buoyancy to avoid a possible runaway ascent, balanced by a surface buoy of sufficient buoyancy to prevent inadvertent descent is desirable. A fairly high volume, low waterplane area buoy will minimise transient vertical forces on the diver, and arm movement can compensate for some of the vertical buoy movement.

=== Decompression emergencies ===
A decompression emergency occurs when the diver cannot safely complete obligatory decompression while ascending, or when an uncontrolled or excessively rapid ascent occurs, or symptoms of decompression sickness develop during the decompression. An uncompleted or omitted decompression could be due to insufficient breathing gas, excessive buoyancy, inability to maintain depth at stops, or a more pressing need to surface due to another emergency. The urgency and severity of the emergency depends on the level of decompression stress and the risk of symptomatic decompression illness developing. Symptomatic decompression illness may develop during or after ascent. The urgency depends on the amount of compromised decompression, and on symptoms and when they occur.

Some decompression emergencies can be mitigated on site, for example, by returning to depth with extra gas and following an omitted decompression procedure, or doing surface decompression if a chamber is available on site. In some circumstances in-water recompression may be appropriate, and in others prophylactic surface breathing of oxygen may be sufficient. Advice from a diving medicine specialist is always appropriate.

=== Emergency decompression ===
An emergency decompression occurs when the diver is prevented from ascending according to the planned schedule, and does not have the necessary information or equipment to do a controlled decompression ascent to an acceptable schedule, or the circumstances do not allow it, or during an emergency ascent, when the diver judges and accepts that the circumstances indicate that the overall risk to life and health are reduced by performing a decompression that is sub-optimal.

== Teaching of decompression practice ==
Basic decompression theory and use of decompression tables is part of the theory component of training for commercial divers, and dive planning based on decompression tables, and the practice and field management of decompression is a significant part of the work of the diving supervisor.

Recreational divers are trained in the theory and practice of decompression to the extent that the certifying agency specifies in the training standard for each certification. This may vary from a rudimentary overview sufficient to allow the diver to avoid decompression obligation for entry level divers, to competence in the use of several decompression algorithms by way of personal dive computers, decompression software, and tables for advanced technical divers. The detailed understanding of decompression theory is not generally required of either commercial or recreational divers.

The practice of decompression techniques is another matter altogether. Recreational divers are expected not to do decompression dives by most certification organizations, though CMAS and BSAC allow for short decompression dives in some levels of recreational divers. Technical, commercial, military and scientific divers may all be expected to do decompression dives in the normal course of their sport or occupation, and are specifically trained in appropriate procedures and equipment relevant to their level of certification. A significant part of practical and theoretical training for these divers is on the practice of safe and effective decompression procedures and the selection, inspection, and use of the appropriate equipment.

== See also ==
- Decompression sickness – Disorder caused by dissolved gases forming bubbles in tissues
- Decompression (diving) – Pressure reduction and its effects during ascent from depth
- Decompression equipment – Equipment used by divers to facilitate decompression
- Decompression theory – Theoretical modelling of decompression physiology
- Dive computer – Instrument to calculate decompression status in real time
- Equivalent air depth – Method of comparing decompression requirements for air and a given nitrox mix
- Equivalent narcotic depth – Method for comparing the narcotic effects of a mixed diving gas with air
- History of decompression research and development
- Hyperbaric treatment schedules – Planned hyperbaric exposure using a specified breathing gas as medical treatment
- Oxygen window – Difference between the partial pressures of oxygen in arterial blood and body tissues
- Physiology of decompression – Physiological basis for decompression theory and practice
- Decompression models:
  - Bühlmann decompression algorithm – Mathematical model of tissue inert gas uptake and release with pressure change
  - Haldane's decompression model – Decompression model developed by John Scott Haldane
  - Reduced gradient bubble model – Decompression algorithm
  - Thalmann algorithm – Mathematical model for diver decompression
  - Thermodynamic model of decompression – Early diving decompression model
  - Varying Permeability Model – Decompression model and algorithm based on bubble physics
