= In-water recompression =

In-water treatment for decompression sickness

In-water recompression (IWR) or underwater oxygen treatment is the emergency treatment of decompression sickness (DCS) by returning the diver underwater to help the gas bubbles in the tissues, which are causing the symptoms, to resolve. It is a procedure that exposes the diver to significant risk which should be compared with the risk associated with the available options and balanced against the probable benefits. Some authorities recommend that it is only to be used when the time to travel to the nearest recompression chamber is too long to save the victim's life; others take a more pragmatic approach and accept that in some circumstances IWR is the best available option. The risks may not be justified for case of mild symptoms likely to resolve spontaneously, or for cases where the diver is likely to be unsafe in the water, but in-water recompression may be justified in cases where severe outcomes are likely if not recompressed, if conducted by a competent and suitably equipped team.

Carrying out in-water recompression when there is a nearby recompression chamber or without suitable equipment and training is never a desirable option. The risk of the procedure is due to the diver suffering from DCS being seriously ill and may become paralysed, unconscious, or stop breathing while underwater. Any one of these events is likely to result in the diver drowning or asphyxiating or suffering further injury during a subsequent rescue to the surface. This risk can be reduced by improving airway security by using surface supplied gas and a helmet or full-face mask. Risk of injury during emergency surfacing is minimised by treatment on 100% oxygen, which is also the only gas with a reliable record of positive outcomes. Early recompression on oxygen has a high rate of complete resolution of symptoms, even for shallower and shorter treatment than the highly successful US Navy Treatment Table 6.

Several schedules have been published for in-water recompression treatment, but little data on their efficacy is available. The Australian Navy tables and US Navy Tables may have the largest amount of empirical evidence supporting their efficacy.

== Background ==
Decompression sickness (DCS) is a medical condition caused by dissolved gases emerging from solution as bubbles inside the body tissues during decompression. DCS most commonly occurs during or soon after a decompression ascent from underwater diving DCS and arterial gas embolism are collectively referred to as decompression illness. Since bubbles can form in, or migrate to, any part of the body, DCS can produce many symptoms, and its effects may vary from joint pain and rashes to paralysis and death. Individual susceptibility can vary from day to day, and different individuals under the same conditions may be affected differently or not at all. The severity of symptoms varies from barely noticeable to rapidly fatal.

The risk of DCS caused by diving can be managed through proper decompression procedures, and contracting the condition has become uncommon. Its potential severity has driven much research to prevent it, and divers almost universally use dive tables or dive computers to limit their exposure, to monitor their ascent speed, and to ensure theoretically adequate decompression stops. If DCS is suspected, it is treated by hyperbaric oxygen therapy in a recompression chamber. Where a chamber is not accessible within a reasonable time frame, in-water recompression may be indicated for a narrow range of presentations, if there are suitably skilled personnel and appropriate equipment available on site. Diagnosis is confirmed by a positive response to the treatment. Early treatment results in a significantly higher chance of successful recovery.

Treatment of DCS utilizing the US Navy Treatment Table 6 with oxygen at 18m or an equivalent alternative is a widely recognised standard of care. Ideally, treatment should take place in a chamber where there is no risk of drowning or hypothermia, and other medical problems can be managed conveniently. Significant delay to treatment, difficult transport, and facilities with limited experience may lead to consideration of on site treatment. Surface oxygen for first aid has been proven to improve the efficacy of recompression and decreased the number of recompression treatments required when administered within four hours post dive. IWR to 9 m breathing oxygen is one option that has shown success over the years IWR is not without risk and should be undertaken with certain precautions. IWR would only be suitable for an organised and disciplined group of divers with suitable equipment and practical training in the procedure.

The principle behind IWR treatment is the same as that behind the treatment of DCS in a recompression chamber: an increase in ambient pressure will reduce the volume of the bubbles allowing better blood transport downstream of the bubbles. If the casualty can breathe pure oxygen further improvements will occur because the increase in the proportion of oxygen in the blood may keep previously oxygen-starved tissues alive and the oxygen window will accelerate the removal of inert gases from the bubbles making the bubbles smaller. The unacceptable risks of oxygen toxicity convulsions can be reduced by recompressing to lower pressures and for shorter durations than otherwise preferred.

Experimental work on verification of decompression tables by the US Navy Experimental Diving Unit with outcomes of symptomatic decompression sickness treated divers displaying symptoms by immediate recompression on oxygen, with 100% resolution of symptoms, and almost all cases resolved during the first treatment on Table 6, most of them during repressurisation or within the first 10 minutes at treatment depth. During the experimental work of developing the standard US Navy treatment tables 5 and 6, some experimentation was done with shorter treatment to shallower depths before standardising on 60 fsw (18 msw). This included immediate recompression on oxygen to 33 fsw (10 msw) for 30 minutes, which provided complete resolution in the majority of cases, but was not as effective as the full Table 6. Compression to 60 fsw (18 msw) would follow if symptoms did not resolve during initial treatment at 33 fsw. This previously unpublished data indicates that immediate recompression on oxygen to shallower depths for shorter periods does positively affect the probable long term outcome of decompression sickness, and compares favourably with outcomes for delayed hyperbaric treatment, and has been used as supporting evidence for new (2022) recommendations on in-water recompression. Outcomes for in-water recompression on other gas mixtures are mostly anecdotal and unsuitable for informing medical policy.(Mitchell et al. Sept 2022 in press)

The use of in-water oxygen at 6 meters has been shown to reduce bubble loads in divers compared to divers breathing oxygen on the surface.

== Risks ==
Any potential benefits of using IWR for earlier recompression should be balanced against the risks. These risks are well known, and their potential mitigations are fairly well understood.

The Royal Australian Navy School of Underwater Medicine was charged to supervise the then non-sanctioned practice of IWR, in response to the very long delays that often occurred between the presentation of DCS and recompression treatment. The issues identified include:

- Inappropriate cases for treatment,
- Oxygen toxicity,
- Emergency termination of treatment,
- Hypothermia
- Adequacy of equipment in remote areas,
- Seasickness,
- Operator expertise and training,
- Safety of the diving attendant and the boat tenders,
- Requirement for medical supervision,
- Transport availability,
- Misuse of equipment,
- Pulmonary barotrauma cases.

=== Risk management ===
In 2018, a group of diving medical experts issued a consensus guideline on pre-hospital decompression sickness management and concluded that IWR is only appropriate in groups that have been trained and are competent in the skills required for IWR and have appropriate equipment.

Mitigation of a CNS oxygen toxicity seizure focuses on protecting the airway to prevent drowning. A full-face mask or mouthpiece retaining strap is reasonably effective though not guaranteed. Tethering the diver to prevent sinking, and providing a safety diver to accompany the diver under treatment at all times, who can recover the diver to the surface immediately in the event of a seizure are also recommended, following the recommended procedures for recovery of a convulsing diver.

== Factors influencing a decision to use IWR ==
Recompression and hyperbaric oxygen administered in a recompression chamber are recognised as the definitive treatment for DCI, but when there is no readily available access to a suitable hyperbaric chamber, and if symptoms are significant or progressing, in-water recompression with oxygen is an option where a group of divers, including the symptomatic diver, already have the necessary equipment and relevant training and knowledge that provides a sufficient understanding of the associated risks to allow the involved parties to collectively accept responsibility for a decision to proceed with IWR.

The decision of whether or not to attempt IWR depends on identifying the diver whose condition is serious enough to justify the risk, but whose clinical condition does not indicate that the risk is unacceptable. The risk may not be justified for mild DCI, if spontaneous recovery is probable whether the diver is recompressed or not, and surface oxygen is indicated for these cases. However, in these cases the risk of the recompression is also low, and early abandonment is also unlikely to cause further harm. There are no firm guidelines regarding expected delay to access of a decompression chamber, but divers generally consider a predicted delay of more than 8 hours from symptom onset to be reason to consider in-water recompression.

=== Environmental conditions ===
Water conditions, such as low temperature and rough sea state are relative contraindications, and the team must take these factors into account. Divers undergoing IWR risk becoming cold or hypothermic. They may already have done long dives in cold water, but the use of dry suits is common for such conditions, and the use of active heating systems in dry suit undergarments may be available. IWR requires a stable platform that can remain in one place for three hours. These factors should be considered when deciding whether to undertake IWR. Deteriorating condition of the diver or environmental conditions may make it necessary to abort or shorten treatment, or terminate it before full resolution. There is no known reason to assume that this would be inherently worse than not providing what treatment is possible at reasonable risk.

=== Indications ===
Indications are based on symptoms and signs of decompression illness where expected benefits are likely to outweigh risk. There is a tension between conditions serious enough to justify the risks and clinical states which indicate excessive risk. Risk may not be considered justified for cases where the symptoms suggest a spontaneous recovery is likely without recompression, although the actual risk in these cases is likely to be relatively low. As of 2018 there is no widely accepted method for objectively selecting divers suitable for in-water recompression, and although remote consultation with a diving medical practitioner is advised by the Doolette and Mitchell 2018 protocol, it is likely that remote advice will vary significantly depending on who is contacted and how willing they are to accept responsibility for giving advice on a procedure with which they may have little personal experience and for which there is no clear decision tree.

An attempt has been made to provide some structure to the decision process which can be useful to divers without medical training, by the technical diving certification organisation International Association of Nitrox and Technical Divers (IANTD), which in consultation with diving medical experts, produced a decision map for field use. The system relies entirely on gross observation, omitting a detailed neurological examination. It categorises symptoms into three "tiers", which correspond roughly with perceived severity of DCI, and appropriateness of IWR in suitable conditions.

Tier 1 symptoms would not be severe enough to justify IWR, but would be monitored and discussed with a remote consultant. These are generally non-specific symptoms which may or may not be of DCI, and are not an immediate or significant threat, such as headache, lethargy, or nausea.

Tier 2 symptoms are severe enough to suggest IWR if they present soon after surfacing, or are progressive, but not necessarily if there is a delay of some hours and the symptoms are not progressive. IWR would be justified for tier 2 when it may prevent the development of more severe symptoms. These symptoms are likely to be of DCI, but are not likely to result in permanent injury or death if not treated. They include musculoskeletal pain, excepting symmetrical girdle pains, lymphatic obstruction with subcutaneous swelling, skin rashes and paraesthesias such as tingling.

Tier 3: symptoms are severe enough to justify IWR if there are no contraindications and the logistical requirements are in place. These symptoms and signs are likely to be of DCI and indicate a risk of permanent injury or death. Some of them are also contraindications to IWR. They include changes in state of consciousness, or obvious confusion, difficulty with speech, visual changes, disturbances in balance, obvious sensory loss (numbness), obvious weakness or paralysis, bladder dysfunction, (usually inability to urinate), bowel dysfunction, loss of limb coordination, shortness of breath, and bilaterally symmetrical girdle pains.

=== Contraindications ===
Symptoms of mild DCS have been described as being one or more of musculoskeletal pain, rash, subjective sensory change in a non-dermatomal distribution, and constitutional symptoms such as fatigue. Divers with only these symptoms could be adequately managed with surface oxygen, observation, and consultation with a diving physician. Exposing divers with stable mild symptoms to the risks of IWR might not be justified. In severe cases the diver may be so compromised that they could not safely endure the procedure. It may be difficult or impossible to reliably codify the decision process.

Some signs of decompression illness which suggest a risk of permanent injury are nevertheless considered contraindications for IWR. Hearing loss and vertigo displayed in isolation with no other symptoms of DCI can have been caused by inner ear barotrauma rather than DCI, and inner ear barotrauma is generally considered a contraindication for recompression. Even when caused by DCI, vertigo can make in-water treatment hazardous if accompanied by nausea and vomiting. A diver with a deteriorating level of consciousness or with a persisting reduced level of consciousness should also not be recompressed in-water nor should a diver who does not want to go back down, or with a history of oxygen toxicity in the preceding dives, altered level of consciousness, shock, respiratory distress, or any physical injury or incapacitation which may make the procedure unsafe. Suspected or confirmed cases of arterial gas embolism (AGE) are generally not considered suitable for IWR due to the high probability of loss of consciousness.

== Protocol ==
Recompression with hyperbaric oxygen administered in a recompression chamber is recognised as the standard of care for decompression sickness, but the infrastructure is expensive and may not be used very often, so many locations do not have convenient access to a suitable facility. If symptoms are significant or deteriorating, in-water recompression using oxygen is an option where groups of divers, including the symptomatic diver, have relevant prior training that allows an understanding of the associated risks and a collective informed acceptance of responsibility for the decision to proceed with treatment. Observational evidence has shown that very early recompression on oxygen usually results in good outcomes, or at least better outcomes than treatment after longer delays.

Recompression on air will initially produce a compression of existing bubbles, and may produce associated clinical improvement, but bubbles will dissolve more slowly due to the lower concentration gradient, and some tissues will absorb more nitrogen. Bubbles nor completely resolved will re-expand during decompression, and may take up more gas, which may cause symptoms to recur or get worse. There is also observational evidence that IWR on air is less effective, so only oxygen is recommended as a treatment gas.

The minimum team would comprise the symptomatic diver, a dive buddy to accompany the diver during the recompression, and a surface supervisor, who must all be competent at decompression procedures using 100% oxygen as the breathing gas.

The team should be suitably equipped with adequate thermal protection, an adequate oxygen supply, a means of delivering oxygen at or near 100% for the duration of both underwater and surface phases of the treatment, a means of voice or written communication, and a method of keeping the diver at the appropriate depth and maintaining position. A full-face mask or mouthpiece retaining strap is strongly recommended as there is observational evidence of these devices preventing drowning of an unconscious diver underwater. Surface supplied oxygen delivered to the casualty by umbilical or airline, and voice communication are desirable options as they allow the surface team members to keep control of the breathing gas supply and allow better monitoring of the diver's condition. Positive pressure masks have been recommended for use with open circuit oxygen, as giving more secure protection of the airway, after their successful use in rescuing the trapped Tham Luang cave group while anaesthetised.

Although the IWR tables are shorter and shallower than most hyperbaric treatment tables, a substantial supply of oxygen is required. The US Navy Type 1 IWR table requires about 160 cubic feet (4,500 L) of oxygen for a diver with a surface consumption rate of 0.5 cubic feet (14 L) per minute, and the Type 2 table would use about 180 cubic feet (5,100 L). The rate of 0.5 cubic feet (14 L) per minute may be optimistic if the diver is stressed due to injury, discomfort, or cold, or if some models of full-face mask are used.

Recognised IWR protocols include the "Clipperton protocol", "Australian method", and the US Navy method for in-water recompression on oxygen.

In-water recompression may not produce complete resolution of DCI, and signs or symptoms may recur. Any diver completing an in-water recompression should consult a diving medical practitioner as soon as reasonably practicable.

== In-water recompression tables ==
Six IWR treatment tables have been published in the scientific literature. Each of these methods have several commonalities including the use of a full face mask, a tender to supervise the diver during treatment, a weighted recompression line and a means of communication. The history of the three older methods for providing oxygen at 9 msw (30 fsw) was described in great detail by Pyle and Youngblood. The fourth method for providing oxygen at 7.5 msw (25 fsw) was described by Richard Pyle at the 48th Annual UHMS Workshop on In-water Recompression in 1999. The Clipperton method involves recompression to 9 msw (30 fsw) while the Clipperton(a) rebreather method involves initial recompression to 30 msw (98 fsw).

The treatment tables recommended for use in chambers are not suitable for in-water recompression as the oxygen partial pressures and the associated risk of oxygen toxicity are too high.

=== Australian in-water recompression table ===
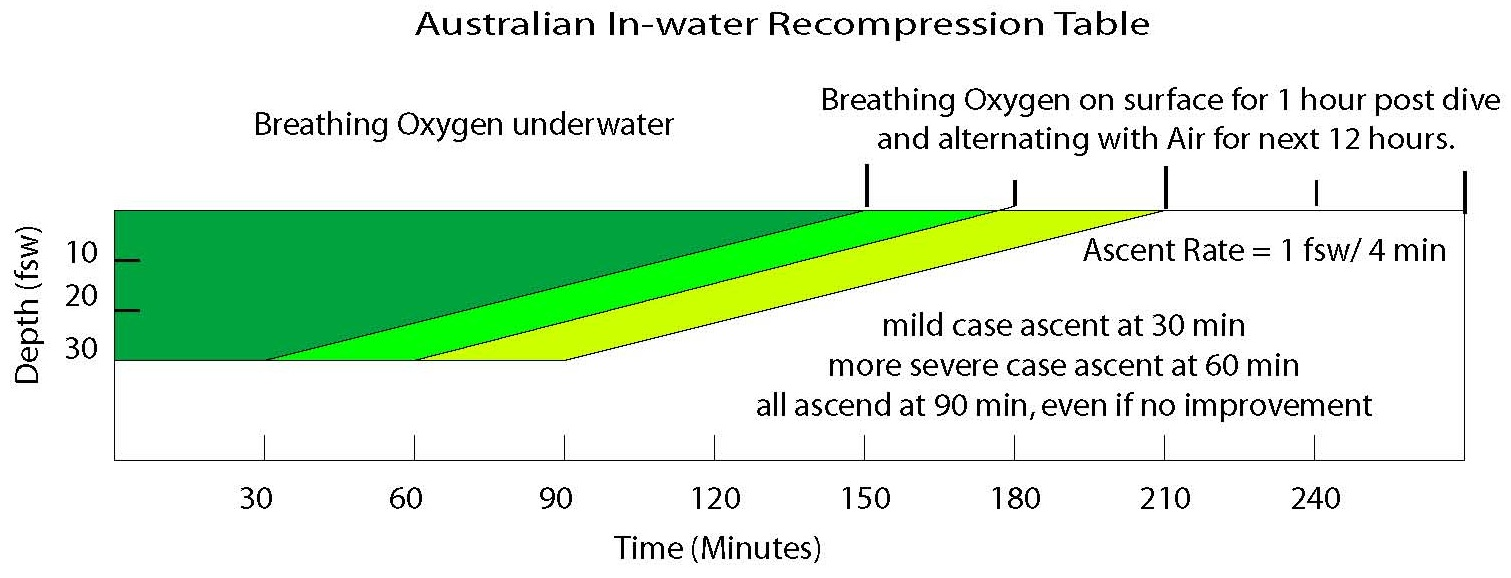
Australian In-water Recompression Table

The Australian IWR Tables were developed by the Royal Australian Navy in the 1960s in response to their need for treatment in remote locations far away from recompression chambers. It was the shallow portion of the table developed for recompression chamber use.

Initial recompression is to 30 fsw (9 msw). Oxygen is breathed during the entire treatment without any air breaks and is followed by alternating periods (12 hours) of oxygen and air breathing on the surface. Surfacing is at 4 minutes per fsw.

=== Clipperton in-water recompression tables ===
Clipperton In-water Recompression Table

Clipperton(a) In-water Recompression Table

The Clipperton and Clipperton(a) methods were developed for use on a scientific expedition to the atoll of Clipperton, 1,300 km from the Mexican coast. The two versions are based on the equipment available for treatment with the Clipperton(a) table being designed for use with rebreathers.

Both methods begin with 10 minutes of surface oxygen. Recompression is to 30 fsw (9 msw) for the Clipperton IWR table, oxygen is then breathed for 60 minutes and while surfacing at 1 metre per minute without any air breaks. For the Clipperton(a) IWR table, descent is made to the initial treatment depth of 30 msw, maintaining a partial pressure of 1.4 ATA. and breathed at that depth for 10 minutes followed by ascent to 9 msw at 1 metre per minute. As near as possible to 100% oxygen is breathed at 9 msw for 30 minutes, followed by ascent to the surface at 1 metre per minute. Oxygen breathing on the surface for 6 hours post treatment and intravenous hydration fluids are also administered following both treatment tables.

=== Hawaiian in-water recompression table ===
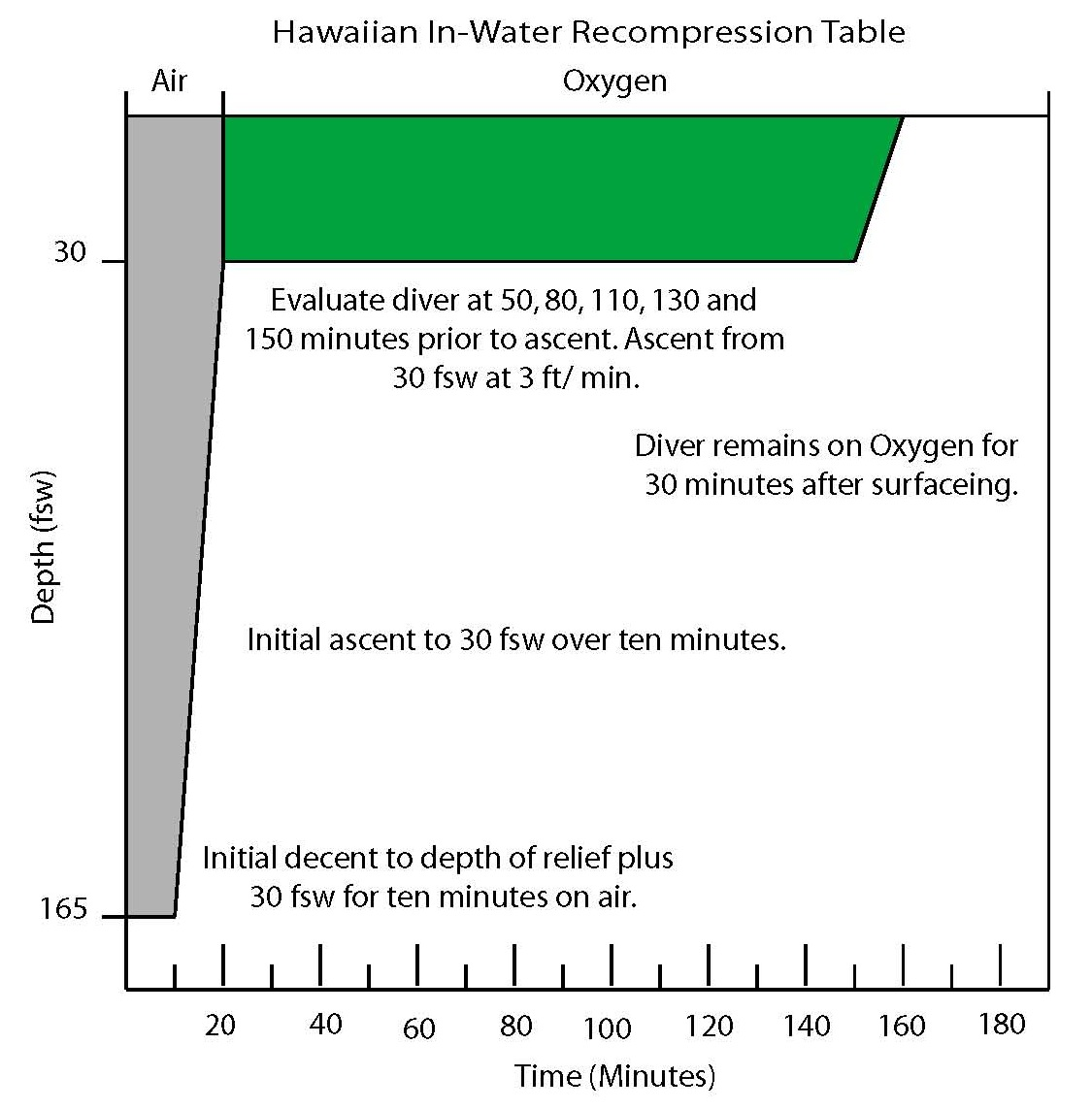
Hawaiian In-water Recompression Table

The Hawaiian IWR table was first described by Farm et al. while studying the diving habits of Hawaii's diving fishermen.

The initial portion of the treatment involves descent on air to the depth of relief plus 30 fsw or a maximum of 165 fsw for ten minutes. Ascent from initial treatment depth to 30 fsw occurs over 10 minutes. The diver then completes the treatment breathing oxygen and is followed by oxygen breathing on the surface for 30 minutes post treatment.

The Hawaiian IWR Table with Pyle modifications can be found in the proceedings of the DAN 2008 Technical Diving Conference.

=== Pyle in-water recompression table ===
Pyle In-water Recompression Table

The Pyle IWR table was developed by Dr. Richard Pyle as a method for treating DCS in the field following scientific dives.

This method begins with a 10-minute surface oxygen evaluation period. Compression to 25 fsw on oxygen for another 10-minute evaluation period. The table is best described by the treatment algorithm. This table does include alternating air breathing periods or "air breaks".

=== US Navy in-water recompression tables ===
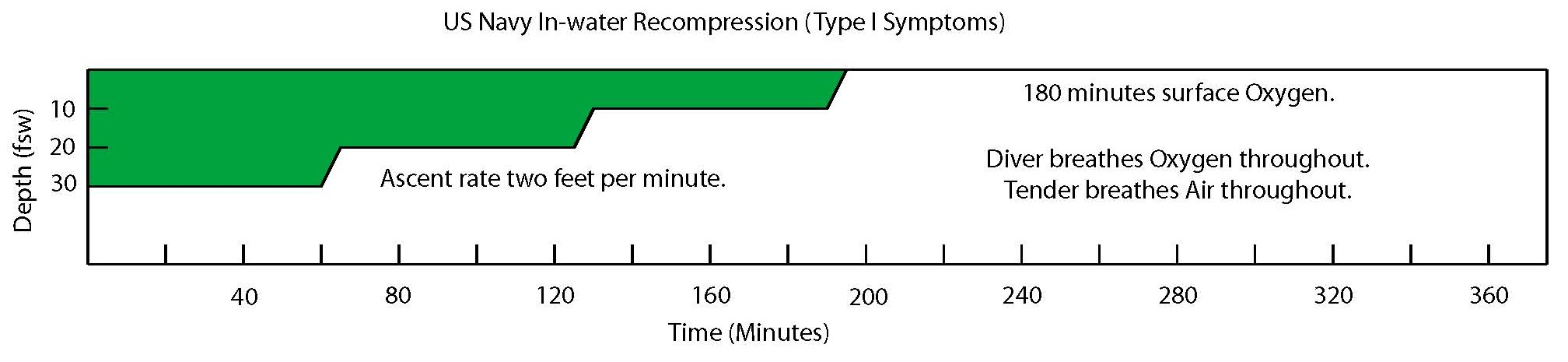
US Navy Type I Symptoms In-water Recompression Table

US Navy Type II Symptoms In-water Recompression Table

The US Navy developed two IWR treatment tables. The table used depends on the symptoms diagnosed by the medical officer.

Oxygen is breathed the entire treatment without any air breaks and is followed by 3 hours of oxygen breathing on the surface.

=== IANTD in water recompression protocol ===
The certification agency International Association of Nitrox and Technical Divers (IANTD) have developed a training program for technical divers to run in water therapeutic recompression for suitably competent technical divers in remote locations, when conditions and equipment are suitable and the condition of the diver is assessed to require emergency treatment and the diver is likely to benefit sufficiently to justify the risk.

Most of the time on hyperbaric oxygen is at 25 fsw (7.5 msw) Oxygen is breathed, with air breaks.

== Clinical significance ==
In-water recompression is a clinically significant method to manage a global shortage of chamber availability for recreational, technical and scientific divers who often dive in places many hours, or days, from the nearest chamber. Minimal delay of recompression is directly related to improved outcomes, and probably to reduced mortality. Divers with the appropriate equipment and training can treat decompression sickness on-site. Such treatment may prevent long-term disability, and can reduce costs and risk to rescue personnel. In-water recompression is a viable alternative when safe and rapid transfer to a suitable recompression chamber is not practicable.

== "Informal" in-water recompression ==
Although in-water recompression is widely regarded as risky, and to be avoided, there is increasing evidence that technical divers who surface and demonstrate mild DCS symptoms may often get back into the water and breathe pure oxygen at a depth of 20 feet (6.1 meters) for a period in an effort to alleviate the symptoms. Divers Alert Network's 2008 accident report mentions this trend, and that although the reported incidents showed very little success, "[w]e must recognize that these calls were mostly because the attempted IWR failed. In case the IWR were successful, [the] diver would not have called to report the event. Thus we do not know how often IWR may have been used successfully."

Historically, the pearl divers of Broome, Western Australia, used decompression tables developed from personal experience, and would return to depth if symptoms of DCI developed on surfacing. These dives and recompression were done on air, using standard diving dress, which provides relatively good airway security. Success was variable, but some divers were treated in this way on several occasions.

== See also ==
- Decompression practice – Techniques and procedures for safe decompression of divers
- Decompression (diving) – Pressure reduction and its effects during ascent from depth
- Decompression sickness – Disorder caused by dissolved gases forming bubbles in tissues
- Hyperbaric medicine – Medical treatment at raised ambient pressure
- Hyperbaric treatment schedules – Planned hyperbaric exposure using a specified breathing gas as medical treatment
