= Hyperbaric nursing =

Nursing specialty in hyperbaric oxygen therapy

Hyperbaric nursing is a nursing specialty involved in the care of patients receiving hyperbaric oxygen therapy. The National Board of Diving and Hyperbaric Medical Technology offers certification in hyperbaric nursing as a Certified Hyperbaric Registered Nurse (CHRN). The professional nursing organization for hyperbaric nursing is the Baromedical Nurses Association.

Hyperbaric nurses are responsible for administering hyperbaric oxygen therapy to patients and supervising them throughout the treatment. These nurses must work under a supervising physician trained in hyperbaric medicine who is available during the treatment in case of emergency. Hyperbaric nurses either join the patient inside the multiplace hyperbaric oxygen therapy chamber or operate the equipment from outside of the monoplace hyperbaric oxygen therapy chamber, monitoring for adverse reactions to the treatment. Patients can experience adverse reactions to the hyperbaric oxygen therapy such as oxygen toxicity, hypoglycemia, anxiety, barotrauma, or pneumothorax. The nurse must know how to handle each adverse event appropriately. The most common adverse effect is middle ear barotrauma, injury to the middle ear due to pressure not being equalised during compression. Since hyperbaric oxygen therapy is usually administered daily for a set number of treatments, adverse effects must be prevented for the patient to receive all scheduled treatments. The hyperbaric nurse will collaborate with the patient's physician to determine if hyperbaric oxygen therapy is appropriate. The nurse must know all approved indications that warrant hyperbaric oxygen therapy treatments, along with contraindications to the treatment.

== History ==
Hyperbaric medicine developed from the treatment of divers to include treatment of other conditions not related to diving, that were found to respond to similar treatment. Hyperbaric nursing began in the 1950s in Europe, and the original process of learning on the job developed into formal training programs by the 1960s.

In 1985, the Baromedical Nurses Association (BNA) was established to promote professional standards, peer support, and continuing education for nurses working in hyperbaric environments. The BNA later partnered with the National Board of Diving and Hyperbaric Medical Technology (NBDHMT) to help develop the Certified Hyperbaric Registered Nurse (CHRN) credential, formalizing the role of the hyperbaric nurse within clinical practice.

== Role ==
The role of the hyperbaric nurse can vary depending on the needs and activity of the facility, and may include.

- Chamber operator for monoplace chambers
- Inside attendant in multiplace chambers
- Patient assessment before and during treatments
- Patient education regarding hyperbaric treatment
- Administrative work at a hyperbaric unit

In addition to these core responsibilities, hyperbaric nurses are trained to recognize and manage hyperbaric-specific risks such as oxygen toxicity, barotrauma, and claustrophobia. They play a key role in emergency preparedness, infection control, and interdisciplinary coordination for complex wound care and critical care patients undergoing HBOT.

== Training and registration ==
The Baromedical Nurses Association Certification Board was established in 1995 and the first hyperbaric nursing certification issued in the same year. As of September 2024 there are over 900 hyperbaric nurses certified by BNACB. Three levels are recognised: Certified Hyperbaric Registered Nurse (CHRN), Advanced Certified Hyperbaric Registered Nurse (ACHRN), and Certified Hyperbaric Registered Nurse Clinician (CHRNC).

In South Africa, CHRNs are registered with the Southern African Underwater and Hyperbaric Medical Association (SAUHMA).

=== Physics ===
It is important for hyperbaric nurses to understand the physics of gases under pressure, and the effects of pressure changes on the volume, temperature, partial pressures of gases in a mixture, the effects of pressure on solubility of gases in body tissues, and the fire hazards associated with high oxygen partial pressures.

=== Physiology of hyperbaric medicine ===
Hyperbaric oxygen therapy (HBOT) involves breathing high concentrations of oxygen at increased ambient pressure, typically 100% oxygen at 1.9 bar and 2.8 bar. For some conditions, even higher pressures may be needed. It is necessary to know the approved conditions for hyperbaric medical therapy because HBOT has a wide range of accepted medical uses, which vary depending on the country. These conditions range from decompression sickness and carbon monoxide poisoning to thermal burns and necrotizing fasciitis.

HBOT works in several ways to provide therapeutic effects:

- The raised pressure shrinks gas bubbles in the blood and tissues by compression, and helps dissolve physiologically inert gas in the bubbles in conditions like decompression sickness and air embolism;
- Breathing 100% oxygen under pressure helps to create favorable concentration gradients, also known as the oxygen window, making it easier to eliminate unwanted gases dissolved in the body tissues.
- High partial pressures of oxygen also boosts the blood's ability to carry oxygen by increasing the concentration of oxygen dissolved in the plasma, providing more oxygen to the tissues than they would receive through normal haemoglobin transport, allowing more oxygen to reach tissues with low oxygen levels. This is important for treating conditions such as carbon monoxide poisoning, where the haemoglobin is disabled, and ischemic injuries where perfusion is poor.

== Occupational hazards ==
The hyperbaric environment exposes people to specific hazards, with their associated risks of adverse consequences. The hyperbaric nurse must understand these hazards, and know how to minimise the risks and mitigate the consequences, both for themself, other clinical staff, and the patient. This includes risks for healthy people and the contraindications for hyperbaric medicine.

- One common issue is middle ear barotrauma (MEBT), which happens when the gas volume in the middle ear changes and the pressure difference across the eardrum is not adequately equalised.
- Dental implants can become less stable with repeated exposure to hyperbaric environments.
- If someone has untreated pneumothorax, HBOT raises a high risk of tension pneumothorax during decompression.
- Acute oxygen toxicity can happen when oxygen partial pressure is too high. There is considerable personal variability in sensitivity, so it is important to manage it carefully. If symptoms occur it may be necessary to reduce oxygen exposure by increasing air breaks or changing the treatment pressure.
- Over prolonged multiple treatments, chronic oxygen toxicity can affect lung function.
- Exposure to high partial pressures of oxygen is known to cause temporary myopia and can accelerate development of cataracts over the long term.
- It is also important to take precautions against chamber fire, like making sure there are no combustible materials exposed to high partial pressures of oxygen, and that patients follow safety protocols, including removing makeup and preventing static discharge.
