= Brian Andrew Hills =

Physiologist who worked on decompression theory

Brian Andrew Hills, born 19 March 1934 in Cardiff, Wales, died 13 January 2006 in Brisbane, Queensland, was a physiologist who worked on decompression theory.

Early decompression work was done with Hugh LeMessurier's aeromedicine group at the department of Physiology, University of Adelaide. His "thermodynamic decompression model" was one of the first models in which decompression is controlled by the volume of gas bubbles coming out of solution. In this model, pain only DCS is modelled by a single tissue which is diffusion-limited for gas uptake, and bubble-formation during decompression causes "phase equilibration" of partial pressures between dissolved and free gases. The driving mechanism for gas elimination in this tissue is inherent unsaturation, also called partial pressure vacancy or the oxygen window, where oxygen metabolised is replaced by more soluble carbon dioxide. This model was used to explain the effectiveness of the Torres Strait Islands pearl divers' empirically developed decompression schedules, which used deeper decompression stops and less overall decompression time than the current naval decompression schedules. This trend to deeper decompression stops has become a feature of more recent decompression models.

Hills made a significant contribution to the mainstream scientific literature of some 186 articles between 1967 and 2006. The first 15 years of this contribution are mostly related to decompression theory. Other contributions to decompression science include the development of two early decompression computers, a method to detect tissue bubbles using electrical impedance, the use of kangaroo rats as animal models for decompression sickness, theoretical and experimental work on bubble nucleation, inert gas uptake and washout, acclimatisation to decompression sickness, and isobaric counterdiffusion.

== Academic timeline ==
- Scholarship to Cambridge University, 1952. BA in physical sciences, master's in chemistry.
- 1963: Senior lecturer in chemical engineering at University of Adelaide.
- 1966: Doctoral thesis on decompression of Torres Island pearl divers, advocated addition of a deep stop to a divers ascent profile.
- Five years at Brown and Duke universities in USA researching gas behaviour in decompression sickness.
- Three years as Professor of Physiology at University of Texas Medical school at Galveston.
- 1975: Awarded a higher doctorate from University of Adelaide for research on decompression sickness.
- 1981: Awarded a higher doctorate (Sc.D.) by University of Cambridge for research on surfactant.
- 1986: Professor and head of the Department of Physiology at the University of New England, Armidale, NSW.
- 1994 - 2004: Director of Golden Casket-funded Paediatric Respiratory Research Laboratory at the Mater Medical Research Institute, Brisbane.

== Hyperbaric research ==
Hills was introduced to the problems of bubble formation in decompressing divers in 1963 by Hugh LeMessurier of the Physiology Department of Adelaide University. Shortly thereafter he switched the topic of his Ph.D. thesis from bubble formation in nylon melts to bubble formation in deep sea divers.

The pearl shell industry centred around Broome had collapsed recently as the button industry switched to plastics and the cultured pearl industry was seen as an opportunity to keep a profitable industry in the far North of Australia. The first pearl farming venture had just been set up at Kuri Bay as a three-way arrangement between a New York company which marketed the product, Japanese experts on pearl seeding and an Australian company which supplied the wild oysters. Two divers died and the Department of Primary Industry (DPI) in Canberra requested the Royal Australian Navy to investigate. The Navy report concluded that the pearl divers were not following the recommendations of the navy diving manual, and in particular were not following Haldanian decompression procedures, standard at the time. The diving company replied that the navy tables required so much decompression time that they were not financially viable.

The DPI contracted LeMessurier and Hills to find out what the pearl divers were actually doing. They arrived in Broome just in time to document the pearling industry's empirically derived decompression procedures developed over the precious century during the boom period of pearl shell collection. From 1890 to 1950 there had been a pearling fleet of up to 800 luggers operating out of Broome, each with two divers. In 1963 there were only 8 luggers still operating, but the divers still used the decompression procedures evolved by trial and error over the previous century. Pearl divers were paid according to the quantity of pearl shell they harvested, and this was a strong incentive to minimize unproductive decompression time. There was no evidence of any medical, mathematical or scientific input to these purely trial and error derived decompression procedures. The price paid by their predecessors was over 3,000 deaths, many more cases of residual neurological injury and an unknown number of cases of limb bends. LeMessurier and Hills found that the pearl divers could decompress, asymptomatically in most cases, in two thirds of the time prescribed by the US Navy air tables. They concluded that the success of the procedures was due to the much deeper initial decompression stops used by the pearl divers.

Hills realised that there was a discrepancy between the wording of the Haldane calculations and the equations used to produce tables. The Haldane and subsequent tables assumed that the asymptomatic decompressed diver must be bubble-free, and claims to be the first to appreciate the different mathematical models required to calculate decompression tables to take into account the presence of the gas phase. This led to the "Thermodynamic" or "Zero-supersaturation" approach to formulating decompression schedules which provided a scientific basis on which profiles resembling those of the pearl divers could be produced. They reported to Canberra that the pearl divers had empirically devised better decompression methods than the navies, but they needed better instrumentation for measuring depth. The DPI allowed the Australian company to continue using its economically viable diving schedules which helped enable the cultured pearl industry to survive its early days and progress to become a flourishing industry. Deep diving is no longer an important part of the cultured pearl industry as it became possible to breed oysters in captivity.

During his time at Adelaide Hills also realised that the metabolic consumption of oxygen produced what he called "inherent unsaturation" in a tissue at steady state, and that this could provide a driving mechanism for inert gas elimination during decompression. This was independently deduced by Albert R. Behnke, who called it the "oxygen window" for decompression.

Hills spent a short sabbatical at Gosport at the invitation of the Royal Navy during which time he used their animal facility to produce results supporting introducing much deeper stops than advocated by 'Haldanian' calculation methods or the U.S. Navy variations thereof. This resulted in the RN adding the time spent at 10 feet to the 20-foot stop for air dives and surfacing directly from 20 feet. This is claimed to have reduced the R.N. bends rate by 75%.

As Associate Professor of Surgery assigned to the Hyperbaric Unit at Duke University, Hills worked on testing and developing tables for much deeper dives on heliox for use in the offshore oil which industry. At Duke he discovered the ability of dissolved gases to induce osmosis and found that decompression bubbles in many tissues were coated by the same surface-active phospholipid (SAPL) known as surfactant in the lung.

While Professor of Occupational Medicine at Dundee and Aberdeen Universities, and as a consultant to several diving companies, Hills found that problematic diving schedules table could often be fixed by introducing one or two short deeper stops at the start of decompression rather than the currently popular practice of adding even more time to a long 10 foot stop, which is consistent with pearl diving practice.

In later years his research was focused on SAPL which was found to be a lubricant in joints, a corrosion inhibitor in the stomach, possibly the substance masking irritant receptors in the bronchi, the lack of which causes asthma, and at other sites where bubble formation was detected in divers. While searching for SAPL as lamellar bodies they were also found in the spinal cord where such nuclei could be conducive to bubble formation in divers.

== Publications ==
=== 1960-1968 ===
- LeMessurier, D.H.; Hills, B.A. (1965). "Decompression Sickness. A thermodynamic approach arising from a study on Torres Strait diving techniques". Hvalradets Skrifter (48): 54–84.
- Hills, B.A. (1966). A thermodynamic and kinetic approach to decompression sickness. Adelaide: Library Board of South Australia.

=== 1970-1979 ===
- Hills, B.A. (1970). "Limited supersaturation versus phase equilibration in predicting the occurrence of decompression sickness". Clinical Science. 38 (2): 251–267. doi:10.1042/cs0380251. PMID 5416153.
- Hills, Brian Andrew (1977). Decompression Sickness, Volume 1, The Biophysical Basis of Prevention and Treatment. John Wiley & Sons, Ltd. ISBN 0-471-99457-X.
- Hills, BA; Butler, BD (1978). "The kangaroo rat as a model for type I decompression sickness". Undersea Biomedical Research. 5 (4). Undersea and Hyperbaric Medical Society, Inc.: 309–21. PMID 734799.
- Hills, BA (1978). "A fundamental approach to the prevention of decompression sickness". Journal of the South Pacific Underwater Medicine Society. South Pacific Underwater Medicine Society. Archived from the original on 7 October 2008.

=== 1980-1989 ===
- Hills, BA; Barrow, RE (1981). "Methods for liquid filling inflated lungs and measuring any retained gas". Undersea Biomedical Research. 8 (3). Undersea and Hyperbaric Medical Society, Inc.: 131–6. PMID 6794206.
- Hills, BA; Butler, BD (1981). "Size distribution of intravascular air emboli produced by decompression". Undersea Biomedical Research. 8 (3). Undersea and Hyperbaric Medical Society, Inc.: 163–170. PMID 7292785.
- Hills, BA (1982). "Basic issues in prescribing preventive decompression". Undersea Biomedical Research. 9 (3). Undersea and Hyperbaric Medical Society, Inc.: 277–80. PMID 7135637.
- Hills, BA; James, PB (1982). "Spinal decompression sickness: mechanical studies and a model". Undersea Biomedical Research. 9 (3). Undersea and Hyperbaric Medical Society, Inc.: 185–201. PMID 7135631.
- Hills, BA; Kanani, B; James, PB (1983). "Velocity of ultrasound as an indicator of bubble content". Undersea Biomedical Research. 10 (1). Undersea and Hyperbaric Medical Society, Inc.: 17–22. PMID 6868177.
- Hills, Brian A. (1988). The Biology of Surfactant. Cambridge University Press. ISBN 978-0-521-30728-4.

=== 1990-1999 ===
- Hills, BA; James, PB (1991). "Microbubble damage to the blood-brain barrier: relevance to decompression sickness". Undersea Biomedical Research. 18 (2). Undersea and Hyperbaric Medical Society, Inc.: 111–6. PMID 2042262.
- Hills, BA (1992). "A hydrophobic oligolamellar lining to the vascular lumen in some organs". Undersea Biomedical Research. 19 (2). Undersea and Hyperbaric Medical Society, Inc.: 107–20. PMID 1561717. Archived from the original on 15 April 2013.
- Hills, BA (1993). "Spinal decompression sickness: hydrophobic protein and lamellar bodies in spinal tissue". Undersea & Hyperbaric Medicine. 20 (1). Undersea and Hyperbaric Medical Society, Inc.: 3–16. PMID 8471958.
- Hills, BA (1994). "Release of surfactant and a myelin proteolipid apoprotein in spinal tissue by decompression". Undersea & Hyperbaric Medicine. 21 (2). Undersea and Hyperbaric Medical Society, Inc.: 95–102. PMID 7520309.
- Hills, B.A (1977). Decompression sickness: the biophysical basics of prevention and treatment. Chichester, UK: John Wiley and Sons.
