= Inner ear decompression sickness =

Medical condition caused by inert gas bubbles forming out of solution

- Other names: Audiovestibular decompression sickness
- Specialty: Diving and hyperbaric medicine
- Symptoms: Vertigo, nystagmus, nausea, ataxia, hearing loss
- Causes: Gas bubbles forming in inner ear and associated vascular system from supersaturation
- Risk factors: Deep diving, long decompressions, gas switching with helium mixtures, right-to-left shunt
- Diagnostic method: By symptoms, inner ear involvement
- Differential diagnosis: Decompression and dive history
- Treatment: Hyperbaric oxygen therapy
- Frequency: rare

Inner ear decompression sickness, (IEDCS) or audiovestibular decompression sickness is a medical condition of the inner ear caused by the formation of gas bubbles in the tissues or blood vessels of the inner ear. Generally referred to as a form of decompression sickness, it can also occur at constant pressure due to inert gas counterdiffusion effects.

Usually only one side is affected, and the most common symptoms are vertigo with nystagmus, loss of balance, and nausea. The symptoms are similar to those caused by some other diving injuries and differential diagnosis can be complicated and uncertain if several possible causes for the symptoms coexist.

First aid is breathing the highest practicable concentration of normobaric oxygen. Definitive treatment is recompression with hyperbaric oxygen therapy. Anti-vertigo and anti-nausea drugs are usually effective at suppressing symptoms, but do not reduce the tissue damage. Hyperbaric oxygen may be effective for reducing oedema and ischaemia even after the most effective period for reducing the injury has passed.

IEDCS is often associated with relatively deep diving, relatively long periods of decompression obligation, and breathing gas switches involving changes in inert gas type and concentration. Onset may occur during the dive or afterwards. IEDCS is a relatively uncommon manifestation of decompression sickness, occurring in about 5 to 6% of cases. The most commonly used decompression models do not appear to accurately model IEDCS, and therefore dive computers based on those models alone are not particularly effective at predicting it, or avoiding it. There are a few rule of thumb methods which have been reasonably effective for avoidance, but they have not been tested under controlled conditions.

== Classification ==
DCS is classified by symptoms. The earliest descriptions of DCS used the terms: "bends" for joint or skeletal pain; "chokes" for breathing problems; and "staggers" for neurological problems. In 1960, Golding et al. introduced a simpler classification using the term "Type I ('simple')" for symptoms involving only the skin, musculoskeletal system, or lymphatic system, and "Type II ('serious')" for symptoms where other organs (such as the central nervous system) are involved. Type II DCS is considered more serious and usually has worse outcomes. This system, with minor modifications, may still be used today. Following changes to treatment methods, this classification is now much less useful in diagnosis, since neurological symptoms may develop after the initial presentation, and both Type I and Type II DCS have the same initial management.

=== Decompression illness and dysbarism ===
The term dysbarism encompasses decompression sickness, arterial gas embolism, and barotrauma, whereas decompression sickness and arterial gas embolism are commonly classified together as decompression illness when a precise diagnosis cannot be made. DCS and arterial gas embolism are treated very similarly because they are both the result of gas bubbles in the body. The U.S. Navy prescribes identical treatment for Type II DCS and arterial gas embolism. Their spectra of symptoms also overlap, although the symptoms from arterial gas embolism are generally more severe because they often arise from an infarction (blockage of blood supply and tissue death).

== Signs and symptoms ==
The usual symptoms are tinnitus, ataxia, difficulty with coordination, vertigo, nausea, vomiting, and hearing loss. It is not unusual for other symptoms of decompression sickness to be present simultaneously, which can make diagnosis easier, but sometimes only vestibular symptoms manifest.

- Onset: The classic vestibular symptoms usually develop within approximately 2 hours, and often within 30 minutes of surfacing, and can occasionally occur during decompression, with an average of 36 minutes after decompression. A sudden onset of vertigo is common, but tinnitus and neural hearing loss may also be present alone or in any combination. Cochlear involvement is indicated by tinnitus or hearing loss, and is reported from about 25% of cases. Divers Alert Network statistics report vertigo occurs in about 19.4% of cases, coordination problems in 7.9% and auditory problems in 2.1%
- Frequency: In a series of 115 cases, reported by Gempp and Louge, vestibular disorders in isolation were observed in the majority of cases, with a small number of coxhlear deficits in isolation. Combinations of vestibular and cochlear symptoms were present in a significant minority of cases, and additional skin and neurological symptoms were also present in a significant minority of cases. In the majority of cases a large right to left shunt was detected, and associated with right sided lateralisation of inner ear symptoms.

== Causes ==
Incompletely understood, but probably caused by nucleation and development of one or more inert gas bubbles which affect the function of the inner ear, either directly in the endolymphatic and perilymphatic spaces or by way of the perfusion or innervation of the inner ear.

It has been hypothesized that in divers with a right-to-left shunt shunt, gas embolism of the labyrinthine artery may be a cause.

== Predisposing factors ==
Several factors are considered likely to increase the risk of IEDCS:

- Environmental: Deep depth of dive; long exposure at depth, causing relatively high saturation of the affected tissues; gas switches, particularly of gases with significantly different diffusivity, such as helium and nitrogen. Helium diffuses into tissues faster than nitrogen diffuses out, which may cause supersaturation even without reducing ambient pressure. Significant post-dive venous bubble presence and tissue supersaturation has been recorded from technical divers after long or deep dives. Deep saturation excursions nearing upward or downward excursion limits.
- Personal: Not conclusively established, but a right-to-left shunt has been associated with several cases. Other studies suggest that most cases are associated with a shunt and significant venous bubble presence, and tissue supersaturation.
- Other circumstantial predisposing factors include consecutive days of diving, with repetitive dives per day, which contribute towards slow tissue saturation, and activity which causes an increase in intrathoracic pressure, which could cause venous blood with a bubble load to be shunted.

== Mechanism ==
The inner ear, particularly the vestibule, is poorly perfused, and when saturated can take a relatively long tine to off-gas, which may be described as a slow tissue compartment. Supersaturated total inert gases loading may be due to decompression or to Isobaric counterdiffusion of gases after a switch in which the new gas mixture contains a relatively high partial pressure of a gas with higher diffusivity than the gas replaced, causing a net ingassing of the affected tissues and a consequently excessive combined inert gas supersaturation. The tissues may remain supersaturated for some time, which may trigger autochthonous bubble formation and growth from pre-existing bubble nuclei, and if venous gas bubbles concurrently pass through a shunt and reach the supersaturated area, the high local inert gas concentration may cause intravascular bubble growth.

=== Pathophysiology ===
The primary provoking agent in decompression sickness is bubble formation from excess dissolved gases. The earliest bubble formation detected is subclinical intravascular bubbles detectable by doppler ultrasound in the venous systemic circulation. The presence of these "silent" bubbles is no guarantee that they will persist and grow to be symptomatic. Gas bubble formation in blood vessels causes obstruction and inflammation, and platelet aggregation may occur. In more solid tissues there may be mechanical damage, and the presence of mobile bubbles in the fluids of the inner ear may cause abnormal stimuli. The pathogenesis remains elusive, and may have more than one mechanism. Development of the inner ear injury has been attributed to a vascular mechanism.

== Diagnosis ==
IEDCS and inner ear barotrauma (IEBt) are the inner ear injuries associated with ambient pressure diving, both of which manifest as cochleovestibular symptoms. The similarity of symptoms makes differential diagnosis difficult, which can delay appropriate treatment or lead to inappropriate treatment.

- A test of pressure can effectively identify that the problem is DCS if the symptoms resolve rapidly on recompression. The effectiveness of this test will largely depend on how soon it can be done after the symptoms manifest. Delays can allow oedema and ischaemia damage to develop, which may take longer to resolve. Failure to resolve rapidly under repressurisation does not necessarily indicate that IEDCS is not the problem, or that bubbles do not or did not exist.
- Differential diagnosis between vertigo caused by IEDCS and all the other possible causes of vertigo in divers relies on dive history and test of pressure.
- Other possible causes of vertigo in divers:
  - Inner ear barotrauma can lead to varying degrees of conductive and sensorineural hearing loss as well as vertigo. It is also common for conditions affecting the inner ear to result in auditory hypersensitivity. Two possible mechanisms are associated with forced Valsalva manoeuvre. In the one, the Eustachian tube opens in response to the pressure, and a sudden rush of high pressure air into the middle ear causes stapes footplate dislocation and inward rupture of the oval or round window. In the other, the tube remains closed and increased cerebrospinal fluid pressure is transmitted through the cochlea and causes outward rupture of the round window.
  - Alternobaric vertigo: Usually transient, but can persist. Has two versions, the usual block on descent, where ambient pressure is greater than pressure in the middle ear, and reverse block on ascent with middle ear pressure greater than ambient pressure, which may persist after surfacing. Reverse block can also occur on descent if the external auditory canal is blocked by an earplug, tightly fitting diving hood, severe exostoses or impacted cerumen. A blockage of the external auditory canal is also a common cause of inner ear barotrauma.
  - Caloric vertigo: A normal response to a temperature difference reaching the semicircular canals, by way of ambient water flooding the external auditory canals unevenly. Also usually transient, but has rarely been known to persist for no obvious reason.
  - Motion sickness: Transient, normally resolves shortly after getting onto solid land.
  - Benign paroxysmal positional vertigo (BPPV) (Vertigo due to detached otolith)

Distinguishing between IEDCS and IEBt can be difficult, and both can be present at the same time. While IEDCS is more likely to cause vertigo, and IEBt is more likely to cause hearing loss, these are not reliable distinguishing factors. Lindfors et al 2021 report that the most useful variables they found for distinguishing between IEBt and IEDCS are dive mode, (scuba versus freediving), breathing gas type (compressed air versus mixed gas), dive profile (deep or shallow), symptom onset (descending versus ascending or at surface), distribution of cochleovestibular symptoms (vestibular versus cochlear) and presence or absence of other DCS symptoms. It is considered appropriate in the presence of any symptom typical of DCS, to assume and treat for DCS with recompression.

Symptom comparison between inner ear barotrauma and inner ear decompression sickness
Barotrauma	Decompression sickness
Conductive or mixed hearing loss	Sensorineural hearing loss
Occurs during descent or ascent	Onset during ascent or after surfacing
Cochlear symptoms (ie hearing loss) predominate	Vestibular symptoms (vertigo) predominant; right sided
History of difficult ear clearing or forced Valsalva manoeuvre	No history of eustachian tube dysfunction
Low-risk dive profile	Depth >15 m, helium mixtures, helium to nitrogen gas switches, repetitive dives
Isolated inner ear symptoms, or inner and middle ear on the same sides	Other neurological or dermatological symptoms suggestive of DCS

== Prevention ==
IEDCS caused by inert gas counterdiffusion can be avoided by avoiding gas switches where the relative concentration of inert gas diluents with dissimilar diffusivity is large.

== Treatment ==
Early recompression treatment with hyperbaric oxygen is more likely to prevent permanent inner ear damage. Recompression increases ambient pressure which returns gases into solution and hyperbaric oxygen improves oxygenation of ischaemic tissues while facilitating inert gas elimination. Slow decompression to normal atmospheric pressure allows controlled outgassing of residual inert gas to avoid re-formation of bubbles. U.S. Navy treatment table 6 has been successfully used, but multiple exposures of hyperbaric oxygen therapy may be necessary if symptoms are not resolved in the initial treatment or if symptoms return. Repeat treatments are focused on resolving sequelae as the initial bubbles will already have been resorbed during adequate initial treatment.

First aid treatment of 100% oxygen, or the highest available oxygen fraction is recommended for several hours or until recompression is available, as this establishes the highest possible ambient pressure oxygen window which induces a maximum inert gas gradient between the lungs and gases in the tissues, resulting in faster inert gas removal, while providing the greatest relief for ischaemic tissues. Rehydration is also indicated. Anti-inflammatory drugs may help, but could also increase leakage of fluids through damaged tissue.

The symptoms of IEDCS are not easily discriminated from symptoms of inner ear barotrauma, and a possible necessity for bilateral myringotomy should be assessed before hyperbaric oxygen therapy is started. In practice, if there is uncertainty about a diagnosis of barotrauma, recompression does not appear to cause harm.

Ameliorative: Anti-nausea drugs may be administered for short term relief. They should not mask vertigo, nystagmus, tinnitis or hearing deficits.

== Prognosis ==
A minority of cases recover completely. About 90% of cases of diving-related vestibular dysfunction have mild to moderate long term residual symptoms. Vestibulocochlear assessment and exclusion of a right-to-left vascular shunt prior to continuing scuba diving is recommended. Recent experience in Finland reports a higher rate of complete recovery, of about 65 to 70% in technical and recreational divers respectively.

== Epidemiology ==
Otological injuries account for about 2/3 of all diving related injuries, but about 50% of all presentations are middle ear barotrauma. Decompression sickness is much less common, and IEDCS is rare, with an estimated incidence rate of 0.01–0.03% in recreational dives. It is becoming more frequently reported, bur epidemiological data remain limited to small case series. The condition is usually associated with deep diving on mixed gas, and is frequently accompanied by other central nervous system symptoms of decompression sickness. However it has also been known to occur as the only manifestation of decompression sickness following moderate or short and shallow scuba dives on air and nitrox.

=== Saturation diving ===
In deep saturation diving, the greater frequency of inner ear DCS after upwards or downwards excursions compared with decompression to sea level may be explained by arterialisation of venous bubbles across pulmonary or intracardiac shunts, and subsequent growth if they reach the inner ear. Experimental work suggests that arterial bubbles last longer at hyperbaric pressures than at sea level.

== See also ==
- Physiology of decompression – Physiological basis for decompression theory and practice
- Decompression theory – Theoretical modelling of decompression physiology
- Isobaric counterdiffusion – Gaseous diffusion through body tissue at constant total pressure
