= Karl E. Huggins =

American decompression researcher

- Education: University of Michigan (B.S. in Atmospheric and Oceanic Science, M.S. in Bioengineering)
- Known for: Development of air decompression tables, Microprocessor-based decompression computer
- Awards: 1990 Leonard Greenstone Diving Safety Award; 1993 DAN/Rolex Diver of the Year; 2004 Conrad Limbaugh Memorial Award for Scientific Diving Leadership; 2008 California Scuba Service Award
- Scientific career
- Fields: Decompression research
- Workplaces: University of Michigan

Karl E. Huggins is an American decompression researcher and author of a set of air decompression tables for reduced risk and multi-level repetitive diving based on the US Navy tables modified to avoid Doppler ultrasound detectable vascular bubble production. He developed the algorithm used by the first commercially successful microprocessor-based decompression computer, the Orca Edge, based on the US Navy decompression algorithm derived by Robert D. Workman, but taking all six tissue compartments (not just the 120 minute compartment) into account when calculating residual nitrogen for multi-level and repetitive dives.

== Education ==
Huggins enrolled in Biological Oceanography at the University of Michigan, Ann Arbor, MI, with courses in aquatic leadership. During this period, he took a course in scuba diving under Lee Somers in 1976, followed by further training in underwater technology and chamber operations. While on the underwater technology course, he became interested in decompression theory and the mathematical modelling used in the calculation of decompression tables. Using research papers by Bruce Bassett, the US Navy medical officers' handbook, and a borrowed programmable calculator, he wrote programs to calculate the decompression status of a diver, which were later run on a HP55 programmable calculator. He graduated with a B.S. in Atmospheric and Oceanic Science in 1979.

He also earned an M.S. in Bioengineering from the University of Michigan in 1986.

== Work on multi-level diving calculations ==
In 1979 on a diving trip to the Bahamas, he was introduced to the concept of multi-level diving and the technique of repet-ups, which was in use by commercial divers as a way to make more effective use of the Navy tables for multi-level diving, though there were some theoretical uncertainties with the system, as the Navy tables of the time used six tissue compartments, but only considered the 120 minute compartment for repetitive groups, an approximation which relied on a minimum surface interval of about 10 minutes between dives, which he addressed by using all the tissue compartments gas loadings to calculate the repetitive group between multi-level depth changes within a dive. These calculations showed that in some cases the use of the navy tables for repet-ups violated allowable gas concentrations, and exposed the diver to higher risk. Using Merrill Spencer's Doppler bubble detection work, Huggins modified the tables to avoid these violations. This new set of tables was named the University of Michigan Sea Grant Tables, colloquially known as the HUGI tables.

== Orca ==
During a year off from studies, Huggins trained as a diving instructor, and later assisted on an instructor training program with Dan Orr and Lee Somers at Wright State University, during which he gave a lecture on decompression models and early dive computers, and met Craig Barshinger, who had recently stated a company named Orca to develop and market microprocessor based dive computers. Barshinger approached Huggins to discuss the possibilities.

Barshinger moved to Pennsylvania and started raising capital for Orca. In 1982 he persuaded Huggins to relocate to Pennsylvania and work on the project full-time with him and partner Jim Fulton.

Huggins left Orca in late 1983 to return to graduate studies, but continued to do consulting work for the company occasionally.

== Career ==
In 1992 Huggins was invited to apply for the post of director of the USC Catalina Hyperbaric Chamber when the former incumbent was about to leave, and has been the director and Diving Control Board Member since then.

- Assistant in Research (1980–1983), Associate Researcher (1984–1985), Research Associate (1985–1992), and Diving Control Board Member (1987–1992), University of Michigan;
- Sport Diving Decompression Table Advisory Board (1988–1992), Diver's Alert Network;
- Vice President for Research and Development (1982–1983), ORCA Industries, Inc.;
- Diving and Decompression Consultant (1981–1994).

== Awards ==
- 1990 Leonard Greenstone Diving Safety Award,
- 1993 DAN/Rolex Diver of the Year,
- 2004 Conrad Limbaugh Memorial Award for Scientific Diving Leadership,
- 2008 California Scuba Service Award,

== Publications ==
- Huggins, Karl E. (1992). Dynamics of decompression workshop. Ann Arbor, Michigan: University of Michigan.
- Huggins, K.E. (2012). Blogg, S.L.; Lang, M.A.; Møllerløkken, A. (eds.). Dive Computer Considerations. Proceedings of the Validation of Dive Computers Workshop, European Underwater and Baromedical Society Symposium, Gdansk. Trondheim: Norwegian University of Science and Technology.
- Huggins, K.E. (1981). New No-Decompression Tables Based on No-Decompression Limits Determined by Doppler Ultrasonic Bubble Detection. #MICHU-SG-81-205 (Report). Ann Arbor: Michigan Sea Grant.
- Huggins, K.E.; Somers, L. (1981). Mathematical Evaluation of Multi-Level Diving. #MICHU-SG-81-207 (Report). Ann Arbor: Michigan Sea Grant.
- Dunford, R.G.; Vann, R.D.; Gerth, W.A.; Pieper, C.F.; Huggins, K.E.; Wacholtz, C.; Bennett, P.B. (2002). "The incidence of venous gas emboli in recreational diving". Undersea and Hyperbaric Medicine. 29 (4). Bethesda: 247–59.
- Huggins, K.E. (1989). The History of Decompression Devices and Computers. Proceedings of the American Academy Dive Computer Workshop. #USCSG-TR-01-89. University of Southern California Sea Grant.
- Huggins, K.E. (2012). Blogg, S.L.; Lang, M.A.; Møllerløkken, A. (eds.). Dive Computer Considerations. European Underwater and Baromedical Society Symposium, Gdansk. Proceedings of the Validation of Dive Computers Workshop. Trondheim: Norwegian University of Science and Technology.
- Huggins, K.E. (1987). Microprocessor Application to Multi-Level Air Decompression Problems. MICHU-SG-87-201 (Report). Ann Arbor: Michigan Sea Grant.
