= Middle ear barotrauma =

Pressure injury to the middle ear

- Other names: Ear squeeze, reverse squeeze
- Symptoms: Hearing loss, local pain
- Complications: inner ear barotrauma, deafness, vertigo, nausea
- Causes: Pressure difference between the external environment and the gas filled space of the middle ear

Middle ear barotrauma (MEBT), also known to underwater divers as ear squeeze and reverse ear squeeze, is injury caused by a difference in pressure between the external ear canal and the middle ear. It is common in underwater divers and usually occurs when the diver does not equalise sufficiently during descent or, less commonly, on ascent. Failure to equalise may be due to inexperience or eustachian tube dysfunction, which can have many possible causes. Unequalised ambient pressure increase during descent causes a pressure imbalance between the middle ear air space and the external auditory canal over the eardrum, causing inward stretching, serous effusion and haemorrhage, and eventual rupture. During ascent internal over-pressure is normally passively released through the eustachian tube, but if this does not happen the volume expansion of middle ear gas will cause outward bulging, stretching and eventual rupture of the eardrum known to divers as reverse ear squeeze. This damage causes local pain (barootitis) and hearing loss. Tympanic rupture during a dive can allow water into the middle ear, which can cause severe vertigo from caloric stimulation. This may cause nausea and vomiting underwater, which has a high risk of aspiration of vomit or water, with possibly fatal consequences.

Middle ear barotrauma can also be caused by shock waves and blows to the external ear, particularly in water, and large or fast changes in altitude or local environment pressurisation.

== Classification ==
Deformation stress trauma caused by externally applied (environmental) pressure differences on the middle ear.

== Signs and symptoms ==
Localised pain (barootitis) in one or both ears while the eardrums are stretched, which may be partly relieved if the eardrum ruptures, followed by longer term dull pain in the injured ears, and possible hearing loss.

=== Complications ===
- Unequal pressures in the middle ears can cause alternobaric vertigo, disorientation and nausea.
- Cold water ingress through a perforated eardrum can cause caloric vertigo, usually a short term effect.
- Ingress of contaminated water through a perforated eardrum can cause infections of the middle ear.
- Over-vigorous attempts to equalise using the Valsalva maneuver can lead to inner ear barotrauma
- Temporary or permanent hearing deficit, vertigo, or balance problems.
- Infections of the external, middle or inner ear.

== Causes ==
Any cause of sufficiently large and rapid environmental pressure change can potentially cause barotrauma. Several commonly recognised examples are listed below.

=== Depth changes while diving ===
When diving, the pressure differences which cause the barotrauma are changes in hydrostatic pressure: There are two components to the surrounding pressure acting on the diver: the atmospheric pressure and the water pressure. A descent of 10 metres (33 feet) in water increases the ambient pressure by an amount approximately equal to the pressure of the atmosphere at sea level. So, a descent from the surface to 10 metres (33 feet) underwater results in a doubling of the pressure on the diver. This pressure change will reduce the volume of a flexible gas-filled space by half. Boyle's law describes the relationship between the volume of the gas space and the pressure in the gas.

Barotraumas of descent are caused by preventing the free change of volume of the gas in a closed space in contact with the diver, resulting in a pressure difference between the tissues and the gas space, and the unbalanced force due to this pressure difference causes deformation of the tissues resulting in cell rupture.

Barotraumas of ascent are also caused when the free change of volume of the gas in a closed space in contact with the diver is prevented. In this case the pressure difference causes a resultant tension in the surrounding tissues which exceeds their tensile strength.

=== Use of a hyperbaric chamber ===
Patients undergoing hyperbaric oxygen therapy must equalize their ears to avoid barotrauma. High risk of otic barotrauma is associated with unconscious patients.

=== Rapid decompression or pressurisation of an artificial environment ===
Explosive decompression of a hyperbaric environment can produce severe barotrauma, followed by severe decompression bubble formation and other related injury. Rapid uncontrolled decompression from caissons, airlocks, pressurised aircraft, spacecraft, and pressure suits can have similar effects of decompression barotrauma.

Collapse of a pressure resistant structure such as a submarine, submersible, or atmospheric diving suit can cause rapid compression barotrauma.

=== Rapid change of altitude ===
A rapid change of altitude can cause barotrauma when internal air spaces cannot be equalised.

=== Self inflicted barotrauma ===
Excessively strenuous efforts to equalise the ears using the Valsalva manoeuvre can overpressurise the middle ear, and can cause middle ear barotrauma. This is more likely to happen when one tube opens and the other remains blocked. When a Valsalva maneuver is performed during descent with the intention of opening the Eustachian tubes, but they do not open, intrathoracic pressure, central venous pressure, spinal fluid pressure, and inner ear pressure are raised further above ambient pressure, which increases the pressure difference between perilymph of the inner ear and the gas space of the middle ear. This can cause the round or oval window to rupture outwards, allowing leakage of perilymph into the middle ear.

=== Blast-induced barotrauma ===
An explosive blast and explosive decompression create a pressure wave that can induce barotrauma. The difference in pressure between internal organs and the outer surface of the body causes injuries to internal organs that contain gas, such as the lungs, gastrointestinal tract, and ear.

=== Impact over the external auditory canal ===
Blows to the outer ear which seal the canal and compress the trapped gas or water can burst an eardrum or cause lesser barotrauma to the middle ear. This is a recognised hazard in several contact sports.

=== Chinook winds ===
Chinook winds can cause a rapid decrease in barometric pressure in the environment, which can contribute to ear barotrauma.

== Mechanism ==
The middle ear is an air-filled space between the external and inner ears. it is separated from the outer ear canal by the eardrum, and connected to the nose and throat cavity by the Eustachian tube. Pressure in the middle ear should match the ambient pressure for normal functioning of hearing. Under-pressure equalisation is normally through periodic opening of the Eustachian tubes during swallowing and yawning, and over-pressure usually vents passively through the collapsed soft part of the tube, as the inner end of the tube is normally closed.

Middle ear barotrauma occurs when a pressure difference develops over the eardrum, causing bulging towards the low pressure side, stretching the tissues which in a severe case can rupture, which immediately equalises the pressure and removes the stretching forces, but leaves local trauma. Stretching of the eardrum to a lesser extent can also cause damage, including engorged blood vessels which exude serum into the surrounding tissues and cause inflammation. increased pressure difference will cause blood vessels to rupture, which may bleed into or inside of the membrane. In divers this usually occurs during descent, when the ambient pressure rises due to increasing hydrostatic pressure. Pressure on the outer side of the eardrum normally closely follows ambient pressure, and in the inner ear pressure equalises through the Eustachian tube, which must be open for gas to flow through. If the diver does not equalise sufficiently a pressure difference may develop that is large enough to damage the eardrum as described. During ascent, the convere occurs, with the internal pressure higher than external. This is usually passively released by the Eustachian tube, but in some cases it does not function correctly causing the eardrum to bulge and possibly rupture outward.

The pressure difference required to rupture the eardrum is thought to be approximately 100 kPA (1 bar or 10 msw).

== Diagnosis ==
Diagnosis is by symptoms, otoscope examination and history.

=== Differential diagnosis ===
Differential diagnosis should consider alternative conditions which could produce the same symptoms. Depending on the actual symptoms presented, such conditions could include: otitis media, otitis externa, cerumen impaction, inner ear decompression sickness, caloric stimulation, benign paroxysmal positional vertigo (BPPV), vestibular neuronitis, Ménière's disease, acoustic neuroma, and possibly others.

If there is sensorineural hearing loss or vertigo after exposure to a large change in ambient pressure or a change of breathing gas, the possibility of concurrent barotrauma and inner ear decompression sickness (IEDCS) should be considered, because the symptoms can be very similar, and IEDCS is treated with recompression and hyperbaric oxygen.

== Prevention ==
Among people playing underwater and swimming contact sports, such as water polo, underwater hockey or underwater rugby, a cap with perforated ear cups is often used, such as a water polo cap.

The risk of stretched or burst eardrums can be reduced by any of a variety of methods to let air into or out of the middle ears via the Eustachian tubes. Sometimes swallowing will open the Eustachian tubes and equalise the ears. Most of the methods are less likely than the Valsalva maneuver to cause collateral damage to the inner ear.

The Eustachian tubes will close completely with a pressure difference of about 3msw (10fsw) above the middle ear pressure, at which point none of the equalising maneuvers will work, and the pressure difference must be decreased to make it possible again. This implies ascending during a dive, venting some of the pressure from a hyperbaric chamber, and ascending to a higher altitude in an aircraft, which is not always practicable.

== Treatment and management ==
If inner ear barotrauma and decompression sickness can be excluded, treatment may include any combination of short term use of nasal decongestants, intranasal steroid sprays and antibiotics for secondary infections. Surgical repair of persistent perforation of the eardrum may be necessary.

Treatment is in proportion to the injury, and may include education to reduce risk of repeat injury. It is often treated conservatively and usually resolves without medical intervention. Some cases are due to simple ambient pressure change and Eustachian tube dysfunction at the time, while others may be partly the consequence of a less obvious underlying condition.

Antibiotics are not usually needed unless infection develops or the ear was exposed to contaminated water.

MEBT may occur during pressurization for hyperbaric treatment for other conditions. If this happens, pressurization should be stopped and if necessary, reversed sufficiently to allow the Eustachian tubes to be opened more easily, and the middle ear to be cleared. Physician-prescribed oral decongestants may help. Compression should normally be aborted if equalization remains unsuccessful. In urgent clinical hyperbaric treatment, an emergency needle myringotomy or placement of tympanostomy ventilation tubes may be required. These will passively equalise the middle ear, and are effective with an unconscious person.

== Outcomes ==
Mild symptoms may resolve within 1 to 2 weeks. All symptoms should be resolved before diving or flying recommences, including healing of any perforations of the eardrum, and equalisation must be possible, with no abnormal sounds, and hearing is normal.

Modified Teed classification for middle ear barotrauma
Barotrauma grade	Otoscope findings	Typical time to return to diving
0	Normal tympanic membrane	7 to 10 days for complete resolution
1	Tympanic membrane erythematous/inflamed	7 to 10 days for complete resolution
3	Gross haemorrhage of the tympanic membrane	Six weeks needed for blood reabsorption
4	Extensive free blood in middle ear with bubbles visible behind tympanic membrane (haemotympanum)	Six weeks needed for blood reabsorption
5	Perforation of the tympanic membrane	Three months to heal perforation
No grade 2 is defined in this modification

== Epidemiology ==
Middle ear barotrauma is the single most common diving disorder for which treatment is sought, at nearly 50% of all reported diving injuries. Many more milder cases may go unreported.

A history of head and neck cancers, with associated radiation treatment, has been associated with a relatively higher incidence of MEBT, possibly due to radiation damage of the soft tissues of the Eustachian tubes or pharynx.

== See also ==
- Alternobaric vertigo – Dizziness resulting from unequal pressures in the middle ears
- Barodontalgia – Tooth pain caused by ambient pressure change
- Barotrauma – Injury due to pressure difference between gas filled space and adjoining tissue
- Diving hazards and precautions – Hazards associated with underwater diving
- Dysbarism – Medical conditions resulting from changes in ambient pressure
- Ear clearing – Equalising of pressure in the middle ears
- Eustachian tube dysfunction – Disorder of the ear
- Inner ear barotrauma – Pressure injury to the inner ear
- Inner ear decompression sickness – Medical condition caused by inert gas bubbles forming out of solution
- Uncontrolled decompression – Unplanned drop in the pressure of a sealed system
