= Decompression sickness =

Disorder caused by dissolved gases forming bubbles in tissues

- Other names: Divers' disease, the bends, aerobullosis, caisson disease
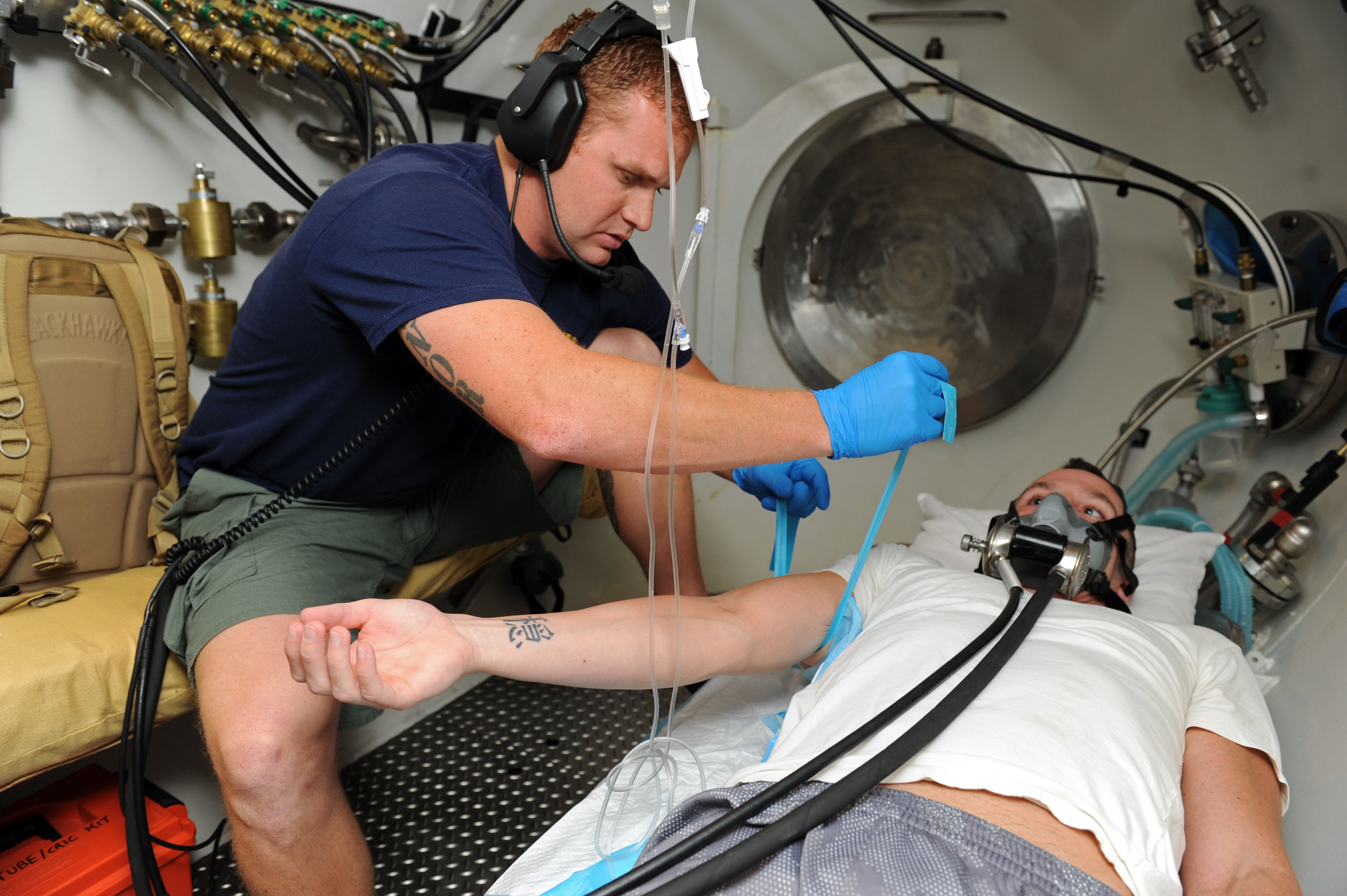
- Two United States Navy sailors demonstrate treatment for decompression sickness inside a decompression chamber
- Specialty: Emergency medicine

Decompression sickness (DCS; also called divers' disease, the bends, aerobullosis, and caisson disease) is a medical condition caused by dissolved gases emerging from solution as bubbles inside the body tissues during decompression. DCS most commonly occurs during or soon after a decompression ascent from underwater diving, but can also result from other causes of depressurization, such as emerging from a caisson, decompression from saturation, flying in an unpressurised aircraft at high altitude, and extravehicular activity from spacecraft. DCS and arterial gas embolism are collectively referred to as decompression illness.

Since bubbles can form in or migrate to any part of the body, DCS can produce many symptoms, and its effects may vary from joint pain and rashes to paralysis and death. DCS often causes air bubbles to settle in major joints like knees or elbows, causing individuals to bend over in excruciating pain, hence its common name, the bends. Individual susceptibility can vary from day to day, and different individuals under the same conditions may be affected differently or not at all. The classification of types of DCS according to symptoms has evolved since its original description in the 19th century. The severity of symptoms varies from barely noticeable to rapidly fatal.

Decompression sickness can occur after an exposure to increased pressure while breathing a gas with a metabolically inert component, then decompressing too fast for it to be harmlessly eliminated through respiration, or by decompression by an upward excursion from a condition of saturation by the inert breathing gas components, or by a combination of these routes. Theoretical decompression risk is controlled by the tissue compartment with the highest inert gas concentration, which for decompression from saturation, is the slowest tissue to outgas.

The risk of DCS can be managed through proper decompression procedures, and contracting the condition has become uncommon. Its potential severity has driven much research to prevent it, and divers almost universally use decompression schedules or dive computers to limit their exposure and to monitor their ascent speed. If DCS is suspected, it is treated by hyperbaric oxygen therapy in a recompression chamber. Where a chamber is not accessible within a reasonable time frame, in-water recompression may be indicated for a narrow range of presentations, if there are suitably skilled personnel and appropriate equipment available on site. Diagnosis is confirmed by a positive response to the treatment. Early treatment results in a significantly higher chance of successful recovery.

== Classification ==
DCS is classified by symptoms. The earliest descriptions of DCS used the terms "bends" for joint or skeletal pain, "chokes" for breathing problems, and "staggers" for neurological problems. In 1960, Golding et al. introduced a simpler classification using the term "Type I ('simple')" for symptoms involving only the skin, musculoskeletal system, or lymphatic system, and "Type II ('serious')" for symptoms where other organs (such as the central nervous system) are involved. Type II DCS is considered more serious and usually has worse outcomes. This system, with minor modifications, may still be used today. Following changes to treatment methods, this classification is now much less useful in diagnosis, since neurological symptoms may develop after the initial presentation, and both Type I and Type II DCS have the same initial management.

=== Decompression illness and dysbarism ===
The term dysbarism encompasses decompression sickness, arterial gas embolism, and barotrauma, whereas decompression sickness and arterial gas embolism are commonly classified together as decompression illness when a precise diagnosis cannot be made. DCS and arterial gas embolism are treated very similarly because they are both the result of gas bubbles in the body. The U.S. Navy prescribes identical treatment for Type II DCS and arterial gas embolism. Their spectra of symptoms also overlap, although the symptoms from arterial gas embolism are generally more severe because they often arise from an infarction (blockage of blood supply and tissue death).

== Signs and symptoms ==
While bubbles can form anywhere in the body, DCS is most frequently observed in the shoulders, elbows, knees, and ankles. Joint pain ("the bends") accounts for about 60% to 70% of all altitude DCS cases, with the shoulder being the most common site for altitude and bounce diving, and the knees and hip joints for saturation and compressed air work. Neurological symptoms are present in 10% to 15% of DCS cases with headache and visual disturbances being the most common symptom. Skin manifestations are present in about 10% to 15% of cases. Pulmonary DCS ("the chokes") is very rare in divers and has been observed much less frequently in aviators since the introduction of oxygen pre-breathing protocols. The table below shows symptoms for different DCS types.

Signs and symptoms of decompression sickness
DCS type	Bubble location	Signs & symptoms (clinical manifestations)
Musculoskeletal	Mostly large joints of the limbs (elbows, shoulders, hip, wrists, knees, ankles)	Localized deep pain, ranging from mild to excruciating. Sometimes a dull ache, more rarely a sharp pain.; Active and passive motion of the joint may aggravate the pain.; The pain may be reduced by bending the joint to find a more comfortable position.; If caused by altitude, pain can occur immediately or up to many hours later.
Cutaneous	Skin	Itching, usually around the ears, face, neck, arms, and upper torso; Sensation of tiny insects crawling over the skin (formication); Mottled or marbled skin usually around the shoulders, upper chest and abdomen, with itching (cutis marmorata); Swelling of the skin, accompanied by tiny scar-like skin depressions (pitting edema)
Neurologic	Brain	Altered sensation, tingling or numbness (paresthesia), increased sensitivity (hyperesthesia); Confusion or memory loss (amnesia); Visual abnormalities; Unexplained mood or behaviour changes; Seizures, unconsciousness
Neurologic	Spinal cord	Ascending weakness or paralysis in the legs; Urinary incontinence and fecal incontinence; Girdling (also referred to as girdle, banding, or tightening feeling) around the abdominal region and/or chest
Constitutional	Whole body	Headache; Unexplained fatigue; Generalised malaise, poorly localised aches
Audiovestibular	Inner ear (Note: Inner ear counter diffusion is a rare form of DCS sometimes experienced by divers engaged in extreme deep diving, caused by switching from a helium-rich gas to a nitrogen-rich gas at the start of a decompression stop. Although nitrogen diffuses more slowly than helium, nitrogen is much more soluble than helium and the total inert gas load in some tissues can temporarily exceed the critical supersaturation limit, resulting in bubble formation. The inner ear is particularly susceptible to this effect. Two of the best-recorded instances of it both occurred at Boesmansgat, South Africa – once to Nuno Gomes in an early world record attempt, and later to Don Shirley when he tried to rescue David Shaw on his fateful dive trying to recover the body of Deon Dreyer, who had been one of Gomes's support divers.)	Loss of balance; Dizziness, vertigo, nausea, vomiting; Hearing loss
Pulmonary	Lungs	Dry persistent cough; Burning chest pain under the sternum, aggravated by breathing; Shortness of breath

=== Frequency ===
The relative frequencies of different symptoms of DCS observed by the U.S. Navy are as follows:

Symptoms by frequency
Symptoms	Frequency
local joint pain	89%
arm symptoms	70%
leg symptoms	30%
dizziness	5.3%
paralysis	2.3%
shortness of breath	1.6%
extreme fatigue	1.3%
collapse/unconsciousness	0.5%

=== Onset ===
Although the onset of DCS can occur rapidly after a dive, in more than half of all cases, symptoms do not begin to appear for at least an hour. In extreme cases, symptoms may occur before the dive has been completed. The U.S. Navy and Technical Diving International, a leading technical diver training organization, have published a table that documents the time to onset of first symptoms. The table does not differentiate between types of DCS, or types of symptom.

Onset of DCS symptoms
Time to onset	Percentage of cases
within 1 hour	42%
within 3 hours	60%
within 8 hours	83%
within 24 hours	98%
within 48 hours	100%

== Causes ==
DCS is caused by a reduction in ambient pressure that results in the formation of bubbles of inert gases within tissues of the body. It may happen when leaving a high-pressure environment, ascending from depth, or ascending to altitude. A closely related condition of bubble formation in body tissues due to isobaric counterdiffusion can occur with no change of pressure.

=== Ascent from depth ===
DCS is best known as a diving disorder that affects divers who have breathed gas that is at a higher pressure than the surface pressure, owing to the pressure of the surrounding water. The risk of DCS increases when diving for extended periods or at greater depth, without ascending gradually and making the decompression stops needed to slowly reduce the excess pressure of inert gases dissolved in the body. The specific risk factors are not well understood and some divers may be more susceptible than others under identical conditions. DCS has been confirmed in rare cases of breath-holding divers who have made a sequence of many deep dives with short surface intervals, and may be the cause of the disease called taravana by South Pacific island natives who for centuries have dived by breath-holding for food and pearls.

Two principal factors control the risk of a diver developing DCS:

1. the rate and duration of gas absorption under pressure – the deeper or longer the dive, the more gas is absorbed into body tissue in higher concentrations than normal (Henry's Law);
2. the rate and duration of outgassing on depressurization – the faster the ascent and the shorter the interval between dives the less time there is for absorbed gas to be offloaded safely through the lungs, causing these gases to come out of solution and form "micro bubbles" in the blood.

Even when the change in pressure causes no immediate symptoms, rapid pressure change can cause permanent bone injury called dysbaric osteonecrosis (DON). DON can develop from a single exposure to rapid decompression.

=== Leaving a high-pressure environment ===
The principal features of a caisson are the workspace, pressurised by an external air supply, and the access tube with an airlock

When workers leave a pressurized caisson or a mine that has been pressurized to keep water out, they will experience a significant reduction in ambient pressure. A similar pressure reduction occurs when astronauts exit a space vehicle to perform a space-walk or extra-vehicular activity, where the pressure in their spacesuit is lower than the pressure in the vehicle.

The original name for DCS was "caisson disease". This term was introduced in the 19th century, when caissons under pressure were used to keep water from flooding large engineering excavations below the water table, such as bridge supports and tunnels. Workers spending time in high ambient pressure conditions are at risk when they return to the lower pressure outside the caisson if the pressure is not reduced slowly. DCS was a major factor during the construction of Eads Bridge, when 15 workers died from what was then a mysterious illness, and later during the construction of the Brooklyn Bridge, where it incapacitated the project leader Washington Roebling. On the other side of the Manhattan island during construction of the Hudson River Tunnel, contractor's agent Ernest William Moir noted in 1889 that workers were dying due to decompression sickness; Moir pioneered the use of an airlock chamber for treatment.

=== Ascent to altitude or exposure to a low ambient pressure ===
A decompression from surface pressure at or near sea level to a lower ambient pressure due to altitude or artificial pressure reduction may cause bubble formation in supersaturated tissues, which is a manifestation of decompression sickness called altitude DCS, hypobaric DCS, or aerospace DCS. This is usually a decompression from saturation at surface pressure. The most common health risk on ascent to altitude is not decompression sickness but altitude sickness, or acute mountain sickness (AMS), which has an entirely different and unrelated set of causes and symptoms. AMS results not from the formation of bubbles from dissolved gases in the body but from exposure to a low partial pressure of oxygen and alkalosis. However, passengers in unpressurized aircraft at high altitude may also be at some risk of DCS.

Altitude DCS became a problem in the 1930s with the development of high-altitude balloon and aircraft flights, but not as great a problem as AMS, which drove the development of pressurized cabins, which coincidentally controlled DCS. Commercial aircraft are now required to maintain the cabin at or below a pressure altitude of 2,400 m (7,900 ft) even when flying above 12,000 m (39,000 ft). Symptoms of DCS in healthy individuals are subsequently very rare unless there is a loss of pressurization or the individual has been diving recently. Divers who drive up a mountain or fly shortly after diving are at particular risk even in a pressurized aircraft because the regulatory cabin altitude of 2,400 m (7,900 ft) represents only 73% of sea level pressure.

Generally, the higher the altitude the greater the risk of altitude DCS but there is no specific, maximum, safe altitude below which it never occurs. There are very few symptoms at or below 5,500 m (18,000 ft) unless the person had predisposing medical conditions or had dived recently. There is a correlation between increased altitudes above 5,500 m (18,000 ft) and the frequency of altitude DCS but there is no direct relationship with the severity of the various types of DCS. A US Air Force study reports that there are few occurrences between 5,500 m (18,000 ft) and 7,500 m (24,600 ft) and 87% of incidents occurred at or above 7,500 m (24,600 ft). High-altitude parachutists may reduce the risk of altitude DCS if they flush nitrogen from the body by pre-breathing pure oxygen. A similar procedure is used by astronauts and cosmonauts preparing for extravehicular activity in low-pressure space suits.

== Predisposing factors ==
Although the occurrence of DCS is not easily predictable, many predisposing factors are known. They may be considered as either environmental or individual. Decompression sickness and arterial gas embolism in recreational diving are associated with certain demographic, environmental, and dive style factors. A statistical study published in 2005 tested potential risk factors: age, gender, body mass index, smoking, asthma, diabetes, cardiovascular disease, previous decompression illness, years since certification, dives in the last year, number of diving days, number of dives in a repetitive series, last dive depth, nitrox use, and drysuit use. No significant associations with risk of decompression sickness or arterial gas embolism were found for asthma, diabetes, cardiovascular disease, smoking, or body mass index. Increased depth, previous DCI, larger number of consecutive days diving, and being male were associated with a higher risk for decompression sickness and arterial gas embolism. Nitrox and drysuit use, greater frequency of diving in the past year, increasing age, and years since certification were associated with lower risk, possibly as indicators of more extensive training and experience.

=== Environmental ===
The following environmental factors have been shown to increase the risk of DCS:

- The larger the pressure reduction ratio, the greater the risk of DCS.
- The longer the duration of a dive, or for aviators, the longer the flight especially at altitudes over 5,500 m (18,000 ft), the greater the risk of DCS.
- The faster the ascent from depth or ascent to altitude, the greater the risk of developing DCS. The U.S. Navy Diving Manual indicates that ascent rates greater than about 20 m/min (66 ft/min) when diving increase the chance of DCS, while recreational dive tables such as the Bühlmann tables require an ascent rate of 10 m/min (33 ft/min) with the last 6 m (20 ft) taking at least one minute. Similarly, an aviator exposed to a rapid ascent to altitude above 5,500 metres (18,000 ft) has a greater risk of altitude DCS than being exposed to the same altitude but at a lower rate of ascent.
- Repetitive dives within a short period of time, a few hours, or for aviators, repetitive ascents to altitudes above 5,500 metres (18,000 ft) within short periods, increase the risk of DCS.
- Ambient temperature – exposure to very cold temperatures may increase the risk of altitude DCS. The risk to divers may be reduced by increasing ambient temperature during decompression following dives in cold water, though risk is also increased by ingassing while the diver is warm and peripherally well-perfused, and decompressing when the diver is cold.
- Ascending to altitude soon after diving increases the risk of developing DCS even if the dive itself complied with the tables. Most tables calculate a dive assuming that the post-dive pressure is sea level. Flying, or even driving to altitude, invalidates this calculation. The effective cabin altitude of even a pressurized aircraft may rise to 2,400 m (7,900 ft) above sea level and driving into mountains, for example: from the coast of Eritrea to the Asmara plateau is the same at 2,400 m (7,900 ft). The tables address these risks by calculating the minimum post-dive time to remain at sea level before flying or climbing; the 'no fly' time, which is, typically, one or two days.
- Diving at altitude where the pressure at the surface is significantly below sea level pressure, for example, Lake Titicaca, which is at 3,800 m (12,500 ft). This requires specialised decompression tables for altitudes exceeding 300 m (980 ft), or dive computers with high-altitude settings or surface pressure sensors.

=== Individual ===
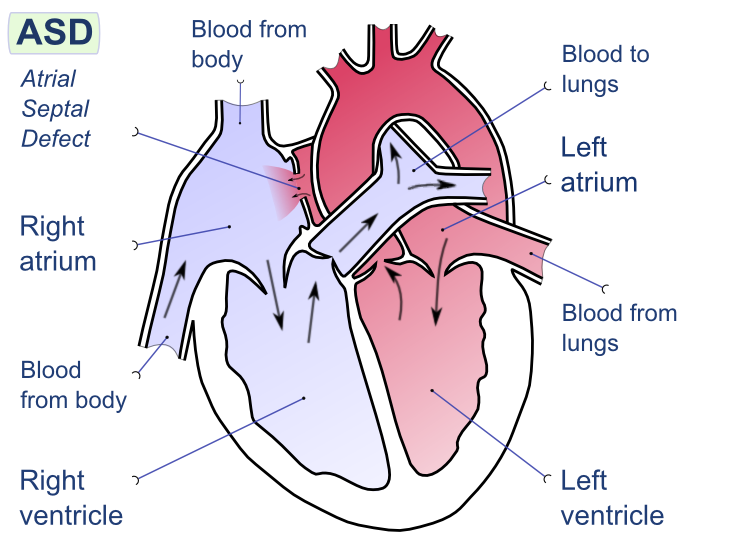
Atrial septal defect (PFO) showing left-to-right shunt. A right-to-left shunt may allow bubbles to pass into the arterial circulation.

The following individual factors have been identified as possibly contributing to increased risk of DCS:

- Dehydration – Studies by Walder concluded that decompression sickness could be reduced in aviators when the serum surface tension was raised by drinking isotonic saline,, and the high surface tension of water is generally regarded as helpful in controlling bubble size. Maintaining proper hydration is recommended. There is no convincing evidence that overhydration has any benefits, and it is implicated in immersion pulmonary oedema.
- Patent foramen ovale – a hole between the atrial chambers of the heart in the fetus is normally closed by a flap with the first breaths at birth. In about 20% of adults, the flap does not completely seal, however, allowing blood through the hole when coughing or during activities that raise chest pressure. In diving, this can allow venous blood with microbubbles of inert gas to bypass the lungs, where the bubbles would otherwise be filtered out by the lung capillary system, and return directly to the arterial system (including arteries to the brain, spinal cord and heart). In the arterial system, bubbles (arterial gas embolism) are far more dangerous because they block circulation and cause infarction (tissue death, due to local loss of blood flow). In the brain, infarction results in stroke, and in the spinal cord it may result in paralysis.
- Age – may increase the risk of altitude DCS.
- Previous injury – there is some indication that recent joint or limb injuries may predispose individuals to developing decompression-related bubbles.
- A person who has a high body fat content is at greater risk of DCS. This is because nitrogen is five times more soluble in fat than in water, leading to greater amounts of total body dissolved nitrogen during time at pressure. Fat represents about 15–25 percent of a healthy adult's body, but stores about half of the total amount of nitrogen (about 1 litre) at normal pressures.
- Alcohol consumption – although alcohol consumption increases dehydration and therefore may increase susceptibility to DCS, a 2005 study found no evidence that alcohol consumption increases the incidence of DCS.

=== "Undeserved" decompression sickness ===
A common misconception or misnomer is "undeserved" decompression sickness, which is more accurately decompression sickness that was not predicted by the algorithm or tables used. The algorithms and tables calculated from them use a simple mathematical model to predict decompression sickness which uses the dive profile as input and a mathematical approximation of tissue gas dynamics which omits a number of factors which are known or suspected to exist, but for which there is no known tested and reliable model to take the effects of these factors into account. In several cases, there is also no currently available way to measure the factors in a meaningful way, so they are either simply omitted or an arbitrary manual or programmed input is used to produce a more conservative, therefore "safer" profile, but the reduction in risk is generally unknown. When these necessarily oversimplified models occasionally fail, some divers claim that the decompression symptoms were "undeserved" as they followed the directions of the computed schedule.

== Mechanism ==
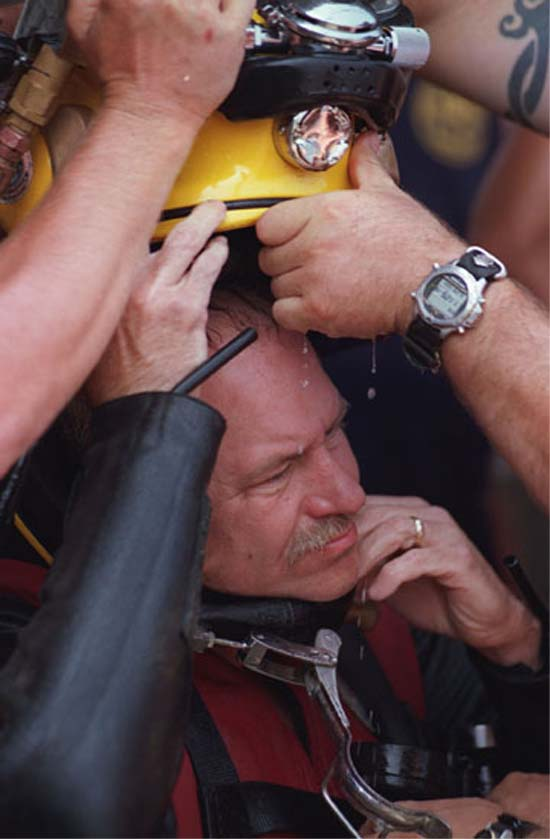
This surfacing diver must enter a decompression chamber for surface decompression, a standard operating procedure to avoid decompression sickness after long or deep bounce dives.

Depressurisation causes inert gases, which were dissolved under higher pressure, to come out of physical solution and form gas bubbles within the body. These bubbles produce the symptoms of decompression sickness. Bubbles may form whenever the body experiences a reduction in pressure, but not all bubbles result in DCS. The amount of gas dissolved in a liquid is described by Henry's Law, which indicates that when the pressure of a gas in contact with a liquid is decreased, the amount of that gas dissolved in the liquid will also decrease proportionately.

On ascent from a dive, inert gas comes out of solution in a process called "outgassing" or "offgassing". Under normal conditions, most offgassing occurs by gas exchange in the lungs. If inert gas comes out of solution too quickly to allow outgassing in the lungs, then bubbles may form in the blood or within the solid tissues of the body. The formation of bubbles in the skin or joints results in milder symptoms, while large numbers of bubbles in the venous blood can cause lung damage. The most severe types of DCS interrupt – and ultimately damage – spinal cord function, leading to paralysis, sensory dysfunction, or death. In the presence of a right-to-left shunt of the heart, such as a patent foramen ovale, venous bubbles may enter the arterial system, resulting in an arterial gas embolism. A similar effect, known as ebullism, may occur during explosive decompression, when water vapour forms bubbles in body fluids due to a dramatic reduction in environmental pressure.

=== Inert gases ===
The main inert gas in air is nitrogen, but nitrogen is not the only gas that can cause DCS. Breathing gas mixtures such as trimix and heliox include helium, which can also cause decompression sickness. Helium both enters and leaves the body faster than nitrogen, so different decompression schedules are required, but, since helium does not cause narcosis, it is preferred over nitrogen in gas mixtures for deep diving. There is some debate as to the decompression requirements for helium during short-duration dives. Most divers do longer decompressions; however, some groups like the WKPP have been experimenting with the use of shorter decompression times by including deep stops. The balance of evidence as of 2020 does not indicate that deep stops increase decompression efficiency. Any inert gas that is breathed under pressure can form bubbles when the ambient pressure decreases. Very deep dives have been made using hydrogen–oxygen mixtures (hydrox), but controlled decompression is still required to avoid DCS.

=== Isobaric counterdiffusion ===
DCS can also be caused at a constant ambient pressure when switching between gas mixtures containing different proportions of inert gas. This is known as isobaric counterdiffusion, and presents a problem for very deep dives. For example, after using a very helium-rich trimix at the deepest part of the dive, a diver will switch to mixtures containing progressively less helium and more oxygen and nitrogen during the ascent. Nitrogen diffuses into tissues 2.65 times slower than helium but is about 4.5 times more soluble. Switching between gas mixtures that have very different fractions of nitrogen and helium can result in "fast" tissues (those tissues that have a good blood supply) actually increasing their total inert gas loading. This is often found to provoke inner ear decompression sickness, as the ear seems particularly sensitive to this effect.

=== Bubble formation ===
The location of micronuclei or where bubbles initially form is not known. The most likely mechanisms for bubble formation are tribonucleation, when two surfaces make and break contact (such as in joints), and heterogeneous nucleation, where bubbles are created at a site based on a surface in contact with the liquid. Homogeneous nucleation, where bubbles form within the liquid itself, is less likely because it requires much greater pressure differences than experienced in decompression. The spontaneous formation of nanobubbles on hydrophobic surfaces is a possible source of micronuclei, but it is not yet clear if these can grow large enough to cause symptoms, as they are very stable.

Once microbubbles have formed, they can grow by either a reduction in pressure or by diffusion of gas into the gas from its surroundings. In the body, bubbles may be located within tissues or carried along with the bloodstream. The speed of blood flow within a blood vessel and the rate of delivery of blood to capillaries (perfusion) are the main factors that determine whether dissolved gas is taken up by tissue bubbles or circulation bubbles for bubble growth.

=== Pathophysiology ===
The primary provoking agent in decompression sickness is bubble formation from excess dissolved gases. Various hypotheses have been put forward for the nucleation and growth of bubbles in tissues, and for the level of supersaturation which will support bubble growth. The earliest bubble formation detected is subclinical intravascular bubbles detectable by Doppler ultrasound in the venous systemic circulation. The presence of these "silent" bubbles is no guarantee that they will persist and grow to be symptomatic.

Vascular bubbles formed in the systemic capillaries may be trapped in the lung capillaries, temporarily blocking them. If this is severe, the symptom called "chokes" may occur. If the diver has a patent foramen ovale (or a shunt in the pulmonary circulation), bubbles may pass through it and bypass the pulmonary circulation to enter the arterial blood. If these bubbles are not absorbed in the arterial plasma and lodge in systemic capillaries, they will block the flow of oxygenated blood to the tissues supplied by those capillaries, and those tissues will be starved of oxygen. Moon and Kisslo (1988) concluded that "the evidence suggests that the risk of serious neurological DCI or early onset DCI is increased in divers with a resting right–to-left shunt through a PFO. There is, at present, no evidence that PFO is related to mild or late-onset bends. Bubbles form within other tissues as well as the blood vessels. Inert gas can diffuse into bubble nuclei between tissues. In this case, the bubbles can distort and permanently damage the tissue. As they grow, the bubbles may also compress nerves, causing pain. Extravascular or autochthonous (Note: autochthonous: formed or originating in the place where found.) bubbles usually form in slow tissues such as joints, tendons and muscle sheaths. Direct expansion causes tissue damage, with the release of histamines and their associated effects. Biochemical damage may be as important as, or more important than, mechanical effects.

Bubble size and growth may be affected by several factors – gas exchange with adjacent tissues, the presence of surfactants, coalescence and disintegration by collision. Vascular bubbles may cause direct blockage, aggregate platelets and red blood cells, and trigger the coagulation process, causing local and downstream clotting.

Arteries may be blocked by intravascular fat aggregation. Platelets accumulate in the vicinity of bubbles. Endothelial damage may be a mechanical effect of bubble pressure on the vessel walls, a toxic effect of stabilised platelet aggregates and possibly toxic effects due to the association of lipids with the air bubbles. Protein molecules may be denatured by reorientation of the secondary and tertiary structure when non-polar groups protrude into the bubble gas and hydrophilic groups remain in the surrounding blood, which may generate a cascade of pathophysiological events with consequent production of clinical signs of decompression sickness.

The physiological effects of a reduction in environmental pressure depend on the rate of bubble growth, the site, and surface activity. A sudden release of sufficient pressure in saturated tissue results in a complete disruption of cellular organelles, while a more gradual reduction in pressure may allow accumulation of a smaller number of larger bubbles, some of which may not produce clinical signs, but still cause physiological effects typical of a blood/gas interface and mechanical effects. Gas is dissolved in all tissues, but decompression sickness is only clinically recognised in the central nervous system, bone, ears, teeth, skin and lungs.

Necrosis has frequently been reported in the lower cervical, thoracic, and upper lumbar regions of the spinal cord. A catastrophic pressure reduction from saturation produces explosive mechanical disruption of cells by local effervescence, while a more gradual pressure loss tends to produce discrete bubbles accumulated in the white matter, surrounded by a protein layer. Typical acute spinal decompression injury occurs in the columns of white matter. Infarcts are characterised by a region of oedema, haemorrhage and early myelin degeneration, and are typically centred on small blood vessels. The lesions are generally discrete. Oedema usually extends to the adjacent grey matter. Microthrombi are found in the blood vessels associated with the infarcts.

Following the acute changes, there is an invasion of lipid phagocytes and degeneration of adjacent neural fibres with vascular hyperplasia at the edges of the infarcts. The lipid phagocytes are later replaced by a cellular reaction of astrocytes. Vessels in surrounding areas remain patent but are collagenised. Distribution of spinal cord lesions may be related to vascular supply. There is still uncertainty regarding the aetiology of decompression sickness damage to the spinal cord.

Dysbaric osteonecrosis lesions are typically bilateral and usually occur at both ends of the femur and at the proximal end of the humerus. Symptoms are usually only present when a joint surface is involved, which typically does not occur until a long time after the causative exposure to a hyperbaric environment. The initial damage is attributed to the formation of bubbles, and one episode can be sufficient; however, incidence is sporadic and generally associated with relatively long periods of hyperbaric exposure and aetiology is uncertain. Early identification of lesions by radiography is not possible, but over time, areas of radiographic opacity develop in association with the damaged bone.

== Diagnosis ==
Diagnosis of decompression sickness relies almost entirely on clinical presentation, as there are no laboratory tests that can incontrovertibly confirm or reject the diagnosis. Various blood tests have been proposed, but they are not specific for decompression sickness, they are of uncertain utility and are not in general use.

Decompression sickness should be suspected if any of the symptoms associated with the condition occur following a drop in pressure, in particular, within 24 hours of diving. In 1995, 95% of all cases reported to Divers Alert Network had shown symptoms within 24 hours. This window can be extended to 36 hours for ascent to altitude and 48 hours for prolonged exposure to altitude following diving. An alternative diagnosis should be suspected if severe symptoms begin more than six hours following decompression without an altitude exposure or if any symptom occurs more than 24 hours after surfacing. The diagnosis is confirmed if the symptoms are relieved by recompression. Although magnetic resonance imaging (MRI) or computed tomography (CT) can frequently identify bubbles in DCS, they are not as good at determining the diagnosis as a proper history of the event and description of the symptoms.

=== Test of pressure ===
There is no gold standard for diagnosis, and DCI experts are rare. Most of the chambers are open to treatment of recreational divers and reporting to Diver's Alert Network see fewer than 10 cases per year, making it difficult for the attending doctors to develop experience in diagnosis. A method used by commercial diving supervisors when considering whether to recompress as first aid when they have a chamber on site is known as the test of pressure. The diver is checked for contraindications to recompression, and if none are present, recompressed. If the symptoms resolve or reduce during recompression, it is considered likely that a treatment schedule will be effective. The test is not entirely reliable, and both false positives and false negatives are possible, however in the commercial diving environment it is often considered worth treating when there is doubt, and very early recompression has a history of very high success rates and reduced number of treatments needed for complete resolution and minimal sequelae.

For pain-only symptoms of suspected decompression sickness, a technique using a blood-pressure cuff on the affected limb can give an indication of likely DCS. The cuff is inflated over the painful area, and if the pressure relieves the pain, it is likely decompression sickness. There is a high rate of false negatives, and the method is not considered reliable. A positive test can be considered to confirm a diagnosis of DCS, but a negative test does not rule it out, and the results of a pressure cuff test do predict the rate of resolution of symptoms during recompression treatment.

=== Differential diagnosis ===
Symptoms of DCS and arterial gas embolism can be virtually indistinguishable. The most reliable way to tell the difference is based on the dive profile followed, as the probability of DCS depends on the duration of exposure and the magnitude of pressure, whereas AGE depends entirely on the performance of the ascent. In many cases, it is not possible to distinguish between the two, but as the treatment is the same in such cases, it does not usually matter.

Other conditions which may be confused include skin symptoms. Cutis marmorata due to DCS may be confused with skin barotrauma due to dry suit squeeze, for which no treatment is necessary. Dry suit squeeze produces lines of redness with possible bruising where the skin was pinched between folds of the suit, while the mottled effect of cutis marmorata is usually on skin where there is subcutaneous fat, and has no linear pattern.

Transient episodes of severe neurological incapacitation with rapid spontaneous recovery shortly after a dive may be attributed to hypothermia, but may actually be symptomatic of short-term CNS involvement due to bubbles which form a short-term gas embolism, then resolve, but which may leave residual problems which may cause relapses. These cases are thought to be underdiagnosed.

Inner ear decompression sickness (IEDCS) can be confused with inner ear barotrauma (IEBt), alternobaric vertigo, caloric vertigo and reverse squeeze. A history of difficulty in equalising the ears during the dive makes ear barotrauma more likely, but does not always eliminate the possibility of inner ear DCS, which is usually associated with deep, mixed gas dives with decompression stops. Both conditions may exist concurrently, and it can be difficult to distinguish whether a person has IEDCS, IEBt, or both.

Numbness and tingling are associated with spinal DCS, but can also be caused by pressure on nerves (compression neurapraxia). In DCS the numbness or tingling is generally confined to one or a series of dermatomes, while pressure on a nerve tends to produce characteristic areas of numbness associated with the specific nerve on only one side of the body distal to the pressure point. A loss of strength or function is likely to be a medical emergency. A loss of feeling that lasts more than a minute or two indicates a need for immediate medical attention. It is only partial sensory changes, or paraesthesias, where this distinction between trivial and more serious injuries applies.

Large areas of numbness with associated weakness or paralysis, especially if a whole limb is affected, are indicative of probable brain involvement and require urgent medical attention. Paraesthesias or weakness involving a dermatome indicate probable spinal cord or spinal nerve root involvement. Although it is possible that this may have other causes, such as an injured intervertebral disk, these symptoms indicate an urgent need for medical assessment. In combination with weakness, paralysis or loss of bowel or bladder control, they indicate a medical emergency.

== Prevention ==
=== Underwater diving ===
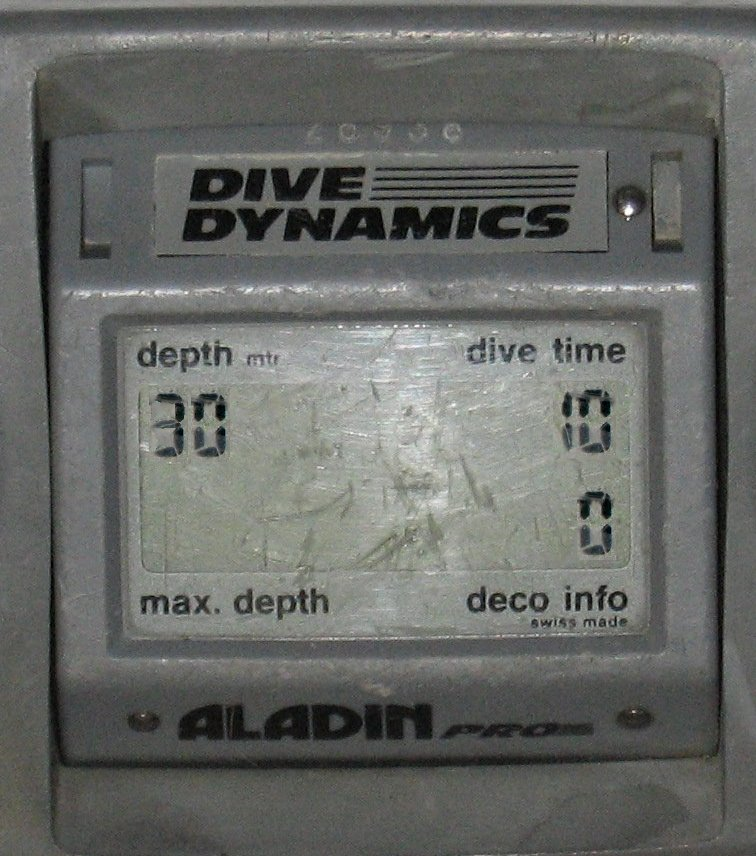
The display of a basic personal dive computer shows depth, dive time, and decompression information.

Video: Setting the bezel of a diving watch to the start time of the dive at the beginning. Divers used this in conjunction with a depth gauge and a decompression table to calculate the remaining safe dive time during dives. Dive computers rendered this cumbersome procedure unnecessary.

To prevent the excess formation of bubbles that can lead to decompression sickness, divers limit their ascent rate—the recommended ascent rate used by popular decompression models is about 10 metres (33 ft) per minute—and follow a decompression schedule as necessary. This schedule may require the diver to ascend to a particular depth, and remain at that depth until sufficient inert gas has been eliminated from the body to allow further ascent. Each of these is termed a "decompression stop", and a schedule for a given bottom time and depth may contain one or more stops, or none at all. Dives that contain no decompression stops are called "no-stop dives", but divers usually schedule a short "safety stop" at 3 to 6 m (10 to 20 ft), depending on the training agency or dive computer. (Note: Tables based on US Navy tables, such as the NAUI tables have a safety stop at 15 feet (5 m);(Lippmann & Mitchell, p. 219) BSAC tables have a safety stop at 6 metres (20 ft); Bühlmann tables have a safety stop at 3 metres (10 ft).)

The decompression schedule may be derived from decompression tables, decompression software, or from dive computers, and these are generally based upon a mathematical model of the body's uptake and release of inert gas as pressure changes. These models, such as the Bühlmann decompression algorithm, are modified to fit empirical data and provide a decompression schedule for a given depth and dive duration using a specified breathing gas mixture.

Since divers on the surface after a dive may still have excess inert gas in their bodies, decompression from any subsequent dive before this excess is eliminated needs to modify the schedule to take account of the residual gas load from the previous dive. This will result in a shorter allowable time under water without obligatory decompression stops, or an increased decompression time during the subsequent dive. The total elimination of excess gas may take many hours, and tables will indicate the time at normal pressures that is required, which may be up to 18 hours.

Decompression time can be significantly shortened by breathing mixtures containing much less inert gas during the decompression phase of the dive (or pure oxygen at stops in 6 metres (20 ft) of water or less). The reason is that the inert gas outgases at a rate proportional to the difference between the partial pressure of inert gas in the diver's body and its partial pressure in the breathing gas; whereas the likelihood of bubble formation depends on the difference between the inert gas partial pressure in the diver's body and the ambient pressure. Reduction in decompression requirements can also be gained by breathing a nitrox mix during the dive, since less nitrogen will be taken into the body than during the same dive done on air.

Following a decompression schedule does not completely protect against DCS. The algorithms used are designed to reduce the probability of DCS to a very low level, but do not reduce it to zero. The mathematical implications of all current decompression models are that provided that no tissue is ingassing, longer decompression stops will decrease decompression risk, or at worst not increase it. Efficient decompression requires the diver to ascend fast enough to establish as high a decompression gradient, in as many tissues, as safely possible, without provoking the development of symptomatic bubbles. This is facilitated by the highest acceptably safe oxygen partial pressure in the breathing gas, and avoiding gas changes that could cause counterdiffusion bubble formation or growth. The development of schedules that are both safe and efficient has been complicated by the large number of variables and uncertainties, including personal variation in response under varying environmental conditions and workload, attributed to variations of body type, fitness and other risk factors.

=== Exposure to altitude ===
One of the most significant breakthroughs in the prevention of altitude DCS is oxygen pre-breathing. Breathing pure oxygen significantly reduces the nitrogen loads in body tissues by reducing the partial pressure of nitrogen in the lungs, which induces diffusion of nitrogen from the blood into the breathing gas, and this effect eventually lowers the concentration of nitrogen in the other tissues of the body. If continued for long enough, and without interruption, this provides effective protection upon exposure to low-barometric pressure environments. However, breathing pure oxygen during flight alone (ascent, en route, descent) does not decrease the risk of altitude DCS as the time required for ascent is generally not sufficient to significantly desaturate the slower tissues.

Pure aviator oxygen, which has moisture removed to prevent freezing of valves at altitude, is readily available and routinely used in general aviation mountain flying and at high altitudes. Most small general aviation aircraft are not pressurized; therefore, oxygen use is an FAA requirement at higher altitudes.

Although pure oxygen pre-breathing is an effective method to protect against altitude DCS, it is logistically complicated and expensive for the protection of civil aviation flyers, either commercial or private. Therefore, it is currently used only by military flight crews and astronauts for protection during high-altitude and space operations. It is also used by flight test crews involved with certifying aircraft, and may also be used for high-altitude parachute jumps.

Astronauts aboard the International Space Station preparing for extra-vehicular activity (EVA) "camp out" at low atmospheric pressure, 10.2 psi (0.70 bar), spending eight sleeping hours in the Quest airlock chamber before their spacewalk. During the EVA they breathe 100% oxygen in their spacesuits, which operate at 4.3 psi (0.30 bar), although research has examined the possibility of using 100% O_{2} at 9.5 psi (0.66 bar) in the suits to lessen the pressure reduction, and hence the risk of DCS.

== Treatment ==
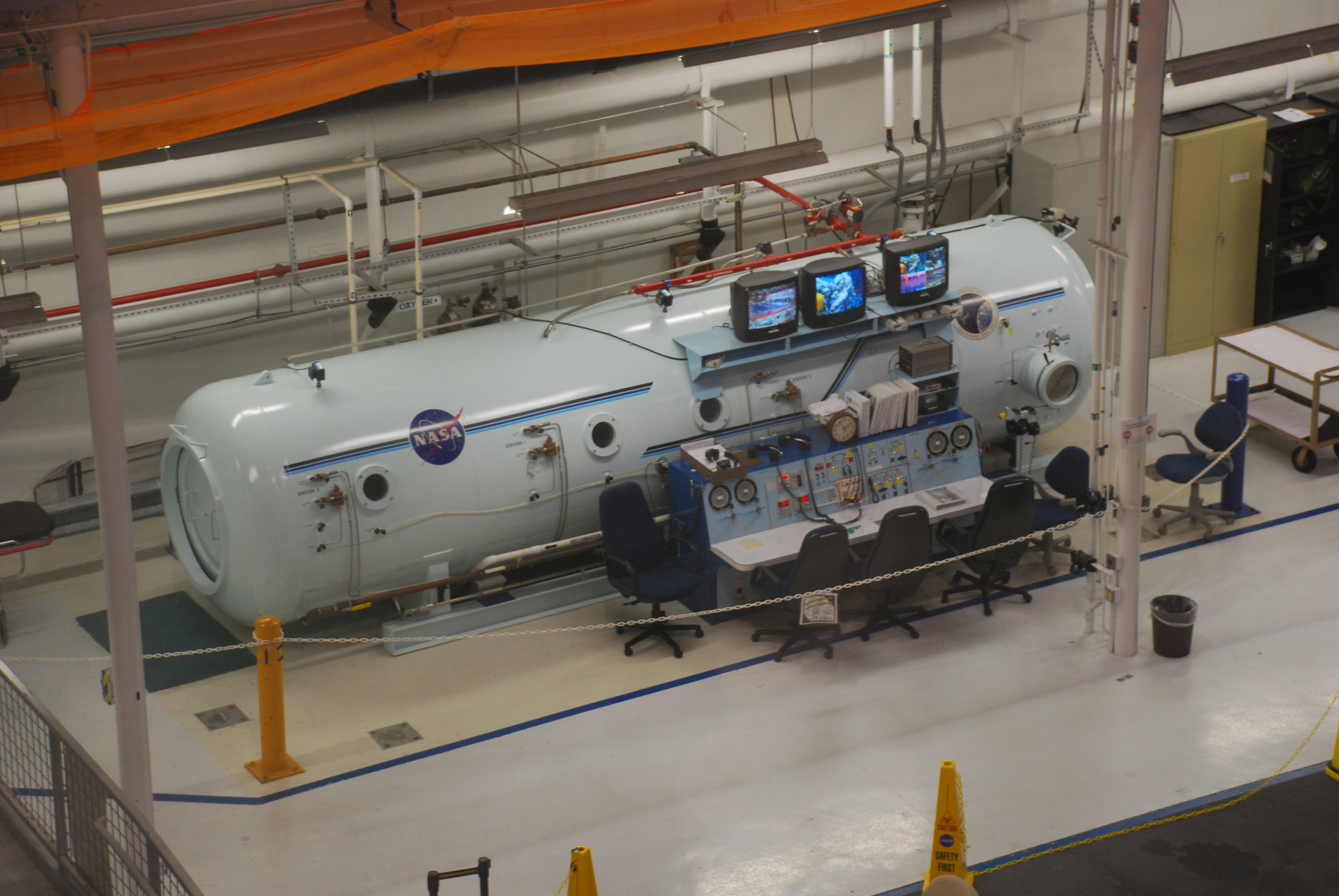
The recompression chamber at the Neutral Buoyancy Lab.

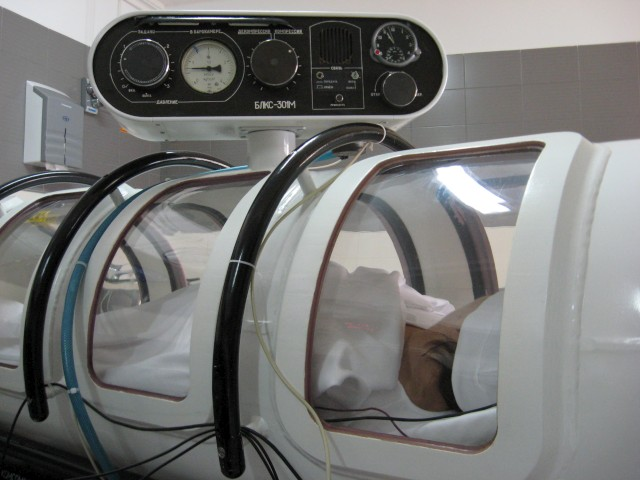
Hyperbaric oxygen treatment in a monoplace chamber

Recompression on air was shown to be an effective treatment for minor DCS symptoms by Keays in 1909. Evidence of the effectiveness of recompression therapy utilizing oxygen was first shown by Yarbrough and Behnke, and has since become the standard of care for treatment of DCS. Recompression is normally carried out in a recompression chamber. At a dive site, a riskier alternative is in-water recompression.

Oxygen first aid has been used as an emergency treatment for diving injuries for years. Particularly if given within the first four hours of surfacing, it increases the success of recompression therapy as well as decreases the number of recompression treatments required. Most fully closed-circuit diving rebreathers can deliver sustained high concentrations of oxygen-rich breathing gas and could be used as a means of supplying oxygen if dedicated equipment is not available.

It is beneficial to give fluids, as this helps reduce dehydration. It is no longer recommended to administer aspirin, unless advised to do so by medical personnel, as analgesics may mask symptoms. People should be made comfortable and placed in the supine position (horizontal), or the recovery position if vomiting occurs. In the past, both the Trendelenburg position and the left lateral decubitus position (Durant's maneuver) have been suggested as beneficial where air emboli are suspected, but are no longer recommended for extended periods, owing to concerns regarding cerebral edema.

=== First aid ===
All cases of decompression sickness should be treated initially with the highest available concentration of oxygen until hyperbaric oxygen therapy (100% oxygen delivered in a hyperbaric chamber) can be provided. Mild cases of the "bends" and some skin symptoms may disappear during descent from high altitude; however, it is recommended that these cases still be evaluated. Neurological symptoms, pulmonary symptoms, and mottled or marbled skin lesions should be treated with hyperbaric oxygen therapy if seen within 10 to 14 days of development. Early recompression has a history of better outcomes and less treatment being needed.

Normobaric oxygen administered at as close to 100% as practicable is known to be beneficial based on observed bubble reduction and symptom resolution. For this reason, diver training in oxygen administration, and a system for administering a high percentage of inspired oxygen at quantities sufficient for plausible evacuation scenarios, is desirable. Where oxygenation may be compromised the administration rate should be adjusted to ensure that the best practicable supplementation is maintained until supplies can be replenished. There is no need for air breaks during oxygen first aid as the partial pressure is too low for acute oxygen toxicity, and the duration is too short for pulmonary toxicity to develop except in exceptional cases. During a prolonged evacuation from a remote place, sufficient air breaks will naturally occur while eating, drinking and taking bathroom breaks.

A horizontal position is preferable during evacuation if possible, with the recovery position recommended for unconscious divers, as there is evidence that inert gas washout is improved in horizontal subjects, and that large arterial bubbles tend to distribute towards the head in upright positions. A head down position is thought to be harmful in DCS.

Oral hydration is often used if the person is fully conscious; fluids are typically isotonic, without alcohol, carbonation or caffeine, as diving is known to cause dehydration, and rehydration is known to reduce post-dive venous gas emboli. Intravascular rehydration is commonly used if trained medical professionals are present. Glucose-free isotonic crystalloid solutions are preferred. Case evidence shows that aggressive rehydration can be life-saving in severe cases.

Non-steroidal anti-inflammatory drug (NSAID), along with hyperbaric oxygen, improves the rate of recovery. The most commonly used NSAIDs are aspirin, ibuprofen, and naproxen; all available over the counter in most countries. Paracetamol (acetaminophen) is generally not considered an NSAID because it has only minor anti-inflammatory activity. Corticosteroids, pentoxyphylline, aspirin, lidocaine and nicergoline have been used in early management of DCS, but there is insufficient evidence on their effectiveness.

Divers are often kept comfortably warm, as warmth can help eliminate gas more quickly, but overheating aggravates neurological injury.

=== Delay of recompression ===
Observational evidence shows that outcomes after recompression are likely to be better after immediate recompression, which is only possible when on-site recompression is possible, although the 2004 workshop on decompression came to the conclusion that for cases with mild symptoms, a delay before recompression is unlikely to cause any worsening of long-term outcomes.

In more serious cases, recompression should be done as soon as safely possible. There is some evidence that delays longer than six hours result in slower or less complete recovery, and the number of treatments required may be increased.

=== Transport of a symptomatic diver ===
Exposing a case of decompression sickness to reduced ambient pressure will cause the bubbles to expand if not constrained by a rigid local tissue environment. This can aggravate the symptoms and should be avoided if reasonably practicable. If a diver with DCS is transported by air, cabin pressure should be kept as close to sea level atmospheric pressure as possible, preferably not more than 150 m, either by cabin pressurisation or by remaining at low altitude throughout the flight. The risk of deterioration at higher altitudes must be considered against the risk of deterioration if not transported. Some divers with symptoms or signs of mild decompression sickness may be evacuated by pressurised commercial airliner for further treatment after a surface interval of at least 24 hours. The 2004 workshop considered it unlikely for this to cause a worse outcome. Most experience has been for short flights of less than two hours. There is little known about the effects of longer flights. Where possible, pre-flight and in-flight oxygen breathing at the highest available percentage is considered best practice. Similar precautions apply to surface transport through higher altitudes.

=== In-water recompression ===
Recompression and hyperbaric oxygen administered in a recompression chamber is recognised as the definitive treatment for DCI, but when there is no readily available access to a suitable hyperbaric chamber, and if symptoms are significant or progressing, in-water recompression (IWR) with oxygen is a medically recognised option where a group of divers including the symptomatic diver already have relevant training and equipment that provides a sufficient understanding of the associated risks and allows the involved parties to collectively accept responsibility for a decision to proceed with IWR.

In-water recompression (IWR) or underwater oxygen treatment is the emergency treatment of decompression sickness by returning the diver underwater to help the gas bubbles in the tissues, which are causing the symptoms, to resolve. It is a procedure that exposes the diver to significant risk which should be compared with the risk associated with the other available options. Some authorities recommend that it is only to be used when the time to travel to the nearest recompression chamber is too long to save the victim's life; others take a more pragmatic approach, and accept that in some circumstances IWR is the best available option. The risks may not be justified for case of mild symptoms likely to resolve spontaneously, or for cases where the diver is likely to be unsafe in the water, but in-water recompression may be justified in cases where severe outcomes are likely, if conducted by a competent and suitably equipped team.

Carrying out in-water recompression when there is a nearby recompression chamber or without suitable equipment and training is never a desirable option. The risk of the procedure is due to the diver suffering from DCS being seriously ill and may become paralysed, unconscious or stop breathing while under water. Any one of these events is likely to result in the diver drowning or asphyxiating or suffering further injury during a subsequent rescue to the surface. This risk can be reduced by improving airway security by using surface supplied gas and a helmet or full-face mask.

Several schedules have been published for in-water recompression treatment, but little data on their efficacy is available.

The decision of whether or not to attempt IWR is dependent on identifying the diver whose condition is serious enough to justify the risk, but whose clinical condition does not indicate that the risk is unacceptable. The risk may not be justified for mild DCI, if spontaneous recovery is probable, whether the diver is recompressed or not, and surface oxygen is indicated for these cases. However, in these cases the risk of recompression is also low, and early abandonment is also unlikely to cause further harm.

==== Contraindications ====
Some signs of decompression illness, which suggest a risk of permanent injury, are nevertheless considered contraindications for IWR. Hearing loss and vertigo displayed in isolation with no other symptoms of DCI can have been caused by inner ear barotrauma rather than DCI, and inner ear barotrauma is generally considered a contraindication for recompression. Even when caused by DCI, vertigo can make in-water treatment hazardous if accompanied by nausea and vomiting. A diver with a deteriorating level of consciousness or with a persisting reduced level of consciousness should also not be recompressed in-water, nor should a diver who does not want to go back down, or with a history of oxygen toxicity in the preceding dives, or any physical injury or incapacitation which may make the procedure unsafe.

=== Definitive treatment ===
The duration of recompression treatment depends on the severity of symptoms, the dive history, the type of recompression therapy used and the patient's response to the treatment. One of the more frequently used treatment schedules is the US Navy Table 6, which provides hyperbaric oxygen therapy with a maximum pressure equivalent to 60 feet (18 m) of seawater (2.8 bar P_{O_{2}}) for a total time under pressure of 288 minutes, of which 240 minutes are on oxygen and the balance are air breaks to minimise the possibility of oxygen toxicity.

A multiplace chamber is the preferred facility for treatment of decompression sickness as it allows direct physical access to the patient by medical personnel, but monoplace chambers are more widely available and should be used for treatment if a multiplace chamber is not available or transportation would cause significant delay in treatment, as the interval between onset of symptoms and recompression is important to the quality of recovery. It may be necessary to modify the optimum treatment schedule to allow use of a monoplace chamber, but this is usually better than delaying treatment. A US Navy treatment table 5 can be safely performed without air breaks if a built-in breathing system is not available. In most cases, the patient can be adequately treated in a monoplace chamber at the receiving hospital.

=== Altitude decompression sickness ===
Treatment and management may vary depending on the grade or form of decompression sickness and the treating facility or organization. First aid at altitude is oxygen at the highest practicable concentration and the earliest and largest practicable reduction in cabin altitude.

Ground-level 100% oxygen therapy is suggested for 2 hours following type-1 decompression sickness that occurs at altitude, if it resolves upon descent. In more severe cases, hyperbaric oxygen therapy following standard recompression protocols is indicated. Decompression sickness in aviation most commonly follows flights in non-pressurized aircraft, flights with cabin pressure fluctuations, or in individuals who fly after diving. Cases have also been reported after the use of altitude chambers. These are relatively rare clinical events.

== Prognosis ==
Immediate treatment with 100% oxygen, followed by recompression in a hyperbaric chamber, will in most cases result in no long-term effects. However, permanent long-term injury from DCS is possible. Three-month follow-ups on diving accidents reported to DAN in 1987 showed 14.3% of the 268 divers surveyed had ongoing symptoms of Type II DCS, and 7% from Type I DCS. Long-term follow-ups showed similar results, with 16% having permanent neurological sequelae. Hyperbaric oxygen has also had generally successful results in treatment of hypobaric decompression sickness.

Long-term effects are dependent on both the initial injury and treatment. While almost all cases will resolve more quickly with treatment, milder cases may resolve adequately over time without recompression, where the damage is minor and the damage is not significantly aggravated by lack of treatment. In some cases the cost, inconvenience, and risk to the patient may make it appropriate not to evacuate to a hyperbaric treatment facility. These cases should be assessed by a specialist in diving medicine, which can generally be done remotely by telephone or internet.

For joint pain, the likely tissues affected depend on the symptoms, and the urgency of hyperbaric treatment will depend largely on the tissues involved.

- Sharp, localised pain that is affected by movement suggests tendon or muscle injury, both of which will usually fully resolve with oxygen and anti-inflammatory medication.
- Sharp, localised pain that is not affected by movement suggests local inflammation, which will also usually fully resolve with oxygen and anti-inflammatory medication.
- Deep, non-localised pain affected by movement suggests joint capsule tension, which is likely to fully resolve with oxygen and anti-inflammatory medication, though recompression will help it to resolve faster.
- Deep, non-localised pain not affected by movement suggests bone medulla involvement, with ischaemia due to blood vessel blockage and swelling inside the bone, which is mechanistically associated with osteonecrosis, and therefore it has been strongly recommended that these symptoms are treated with hyperbaric oxygen.

== Epidemiology ==
A fundamental difference between DCS caused by decompression from hyperbaric exposure and from hypobaric exposure, is that in the first category the affected person develops symptoms while returning to normal conditions, usually after an exposure which leaves tissues in varying states of supersaturation, and treatment typically requires hypobaric pressures to alleviate symptoms, while the second category is usually decompression from saturation at normal conditions, and the symptoms occur during an upward excursion from those conditions, and a return to normal conditions will of itself provide a certain amount of therapy.

=== DCS from hyperbaric exposure ===
The incidence of decompression sickness in surface oriented divers is rare, estimated at 2.8 to 4 cases per 10,000 dives, with the risk 2.6 times greater for males than females. DCS affects approximately 1,000 U.S. scuba divers per year. In 1999, the Divers Alert Network (DAN) created "Project Dive Exploration" to collect data on dive profiles and incidents. From 1998 to 2002, they recorded 50,150 dives, from which 28 recompressions were required – although these will almost certainly contain incidents of arterial gas embolism (AGE) – a rate of about 0.05%.

According to Divers Alert Network the number of recreational divers who experience decompression sickness at some time is less than 1%, and the risk decreases with greater experience, suggesting a greater level of skill is more important than a higher exposure rate and lower physical fitness due to age.

It is difficult to assess decompression risk in recent saturation decompressions as the data is generally not available; however, it is known to be very uncommon since 2000, with some operators not having any cases in a 10-year period, while in the early days of commercial saturation diving, it was in the order of 1%. Saturation decompression is most likely to produce joint pain symptoms in the late stages of decompression. Venous gas bubbles are generally detected without symptomatic DCS, but this has also become rare.

Around 2013, Honduras had the highest number of decompression-related deaths and disabilities in the world, caused by unsafe practices in lobster diving among the indigenous Miskito people, who face great economic pressures. At that time, it was estimated that in the country over 2000 divers had been injured and 300 others had died since the 1970s.

=== DCS from hypobaric exposure ===
Altitude DCS can occur as a consequence of unpressurized aircraft flights, flights experiencing severe cabin pressure fluctuations, flying shortly after diving, and exposure to low pressure in hypobaric chambers. Populations at high risk for altitude decompression sickness include :

- High-altitude high-opening (HAHO) and high-altitude low-opening (HALO) parachutists, and parachutist dispatchers.
- High altitude aerial reconnaissance aircrew.
- Astronauts,
- High altitude climbers.

The most common manifestation of altitude DCS is pain in the shoulders caused by gas bubbles, followed by elbows, knees, and ankles. Joint pain occurs in 60 to 70% of all reported altitude DCS cases. Neurological decompression sickness comprises a very low proportion of DCS caused by hypobaric exposure, but it is more likely to involve the brain than the spinal cord. Symptoms may range from slow thought processes to more severe confusion, aphasia, unresponsiveness or permanent cognitive capacity reduction.

Less than 13% of cases occurred in exposures lower than 25,000 feet. Risk is increased by even mild hyperbaric exposure within the preceding 24 hours, and reduced by oxygen prebreathing before flight. Repetitive exposures, rapid altitude increases, and long exposure times increase risk. Sulaiman et al 1997 found a distinct trend toward increased susceptibility to altitude decompression sickness with increasing age, particularly in subjects over 42 years old. Simulated EVA exposure tests by NASA showed a strong correlation between detectable precordial bubbles and symptomatic DCS, and between repeated exposures and DCS.

Exercise, altitude and the ratio of oxygen pre-breathing to exposure time were found to be the most significant risk factors. The effects of physiological factors such as age, physique, fitness, presence of PFO, gender, and hydration status in a hypobaric environment on DCS risk remain unknown due to a lack of relevant studies.

== Timeline ==
The history of decompression sickness originates in the observation that rapid decompression can produce signs and symptoms of characteristic disorders, which are to a significant extent reproducible within a fairly broad range. Once this had been established by observation, the efforts to explain the etiology followed, as did experimental work intended to provide treatment and reduce risk. As the technology of diving developed, greater exposure to decompression risk and symptomatic disorders followed, and as there are strong economic incentives to the use of hyperbaric and hypobaric workplace exposures, concern for the health and safety of persons at risk encouraged further research.

- 1670: Robert Boyle demonstrated that a reduction in ambient pressure could lead to bubble formation in living tissue. This description of a bubble forming in the eye of a viper subjected to a near vacuum was the first recorded description of decompression sickness.
- 1769: Giovanni Morgagni described the post mortem findings of air in cerebral circulation and surmised that this was the cause of death.
- 1840: Charles Pasley, who was involved in the recovery of the sunken warship HMS Royal George, commented that, of those having made frequent dives, "not a man escaped the repeated attacks of rheumatism (Note: At the time the symptoms of decompression sickness were assumed to be those of rheumatism) and cold".
- 1841: First documented case of decompression sickness, reported by mining engineer Jacques Triger, who observed pain and muscle cramps among coal miners working in mine shafts air-pressurized to keep water out.
- 1854: Decompression sickness reported and one resulting death of caisson workers on the Royal Albert Bridge.
- 1867: Panamanian pearl divers using the revolutionary Sub Marine Explorer submersible repeatedly experienced "fever" due to rapid ascents. Continued sickness led to the vessel's abandonment in 1869.
- 1870: Louis Bauer published outcomes of 25 paralyzed caisson workers on the Eads Bridge.
  - From 1870 to 1910, all prominent features were established. Explanations at the time included: cold or exhaustion causing reflex spinal cord damage; electricity caused by friction on compression; or organ congestion; and vascular stasis caused by decompression.
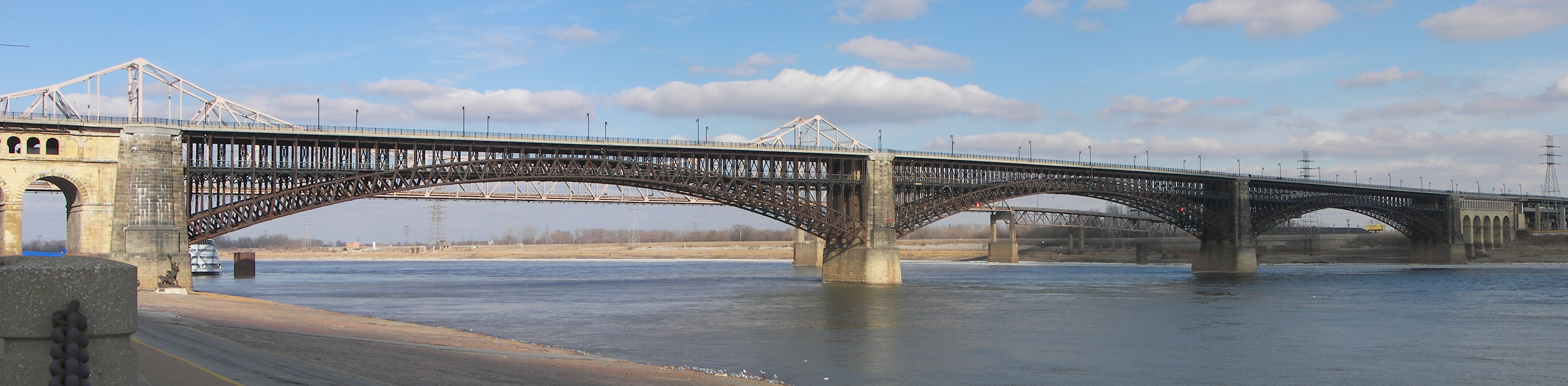
    The Eads Bridge where 42 workers were injured by caisson disease
- 1871: The Eads Bridge in St Louis employed 352 compressed air workers including Alphonse Jaminet as the physician in charge. There were 30 seriously injured and 12 fatalities. Jaminet himself developed decompression sickness and his personal description was the first such recorded. According to Divers Alert Network, in its Inert Gas Exchange, Bubbles and Decompression Theory course, this is where "bends" was first used to refer to DCS.
- 1872: The similarity between decompression sickness and iatrogenic air embolism, as well as the relationship between inadequate decompression and decompression sickness, was noted by Friedburg. He suggested that intravascular gas was released by rapid decompression and recommended: slow compression and decompression; four-hour working shifts; limit to maximum pressure of 44.1 psig (4 atm); using only healthy workers; and recompression treatment for severe cases.
- 1873: Andrew Smith first used the term "caisson disease" describing 110 cases of decompression sickness as the physician in charge during construction of the Brooklyn Bridge. The project employed 600 compressed air workers. Recompression treatment was not used. The project chief engineer Washington Roebling had caisson disease, and endured the after-effects of the disease for the rest of his life. During this project, decompression sickness became known as "The Grecian Bends" or simply "the bends" because affected individuals characteristically bent forward at the hips: this is possibly reminiscent of a then popular women's fashion and dance maneuver known as the Grecian Bend.
- 1890: During construction of the Hudson River Tunnel contractor's agent Ernest William Moir pioneered the use of an airlock chamber for treatment.
- 1900: Leonard Hill used a frog model to prove that decompression causes bubbles and that recompression resolves them. Hill advocated linear or uniform decompression profiles. This type of decompression is used today by saturation divers. His work was financed by Augustus Siebe and the Siebe Gorman Company.
- 1904: Tunnel building to and from Manhattan Island caused over 3,000 injuries and over 30 deaths, which led to laws requiring PSI limits and decompression rules for "sandhogs" in the United States.
- 1904: Siebe and Gorman, in conjunction with Leonard Hill, developed and produced a closed bell in which a diver can be decompressed at the surface.
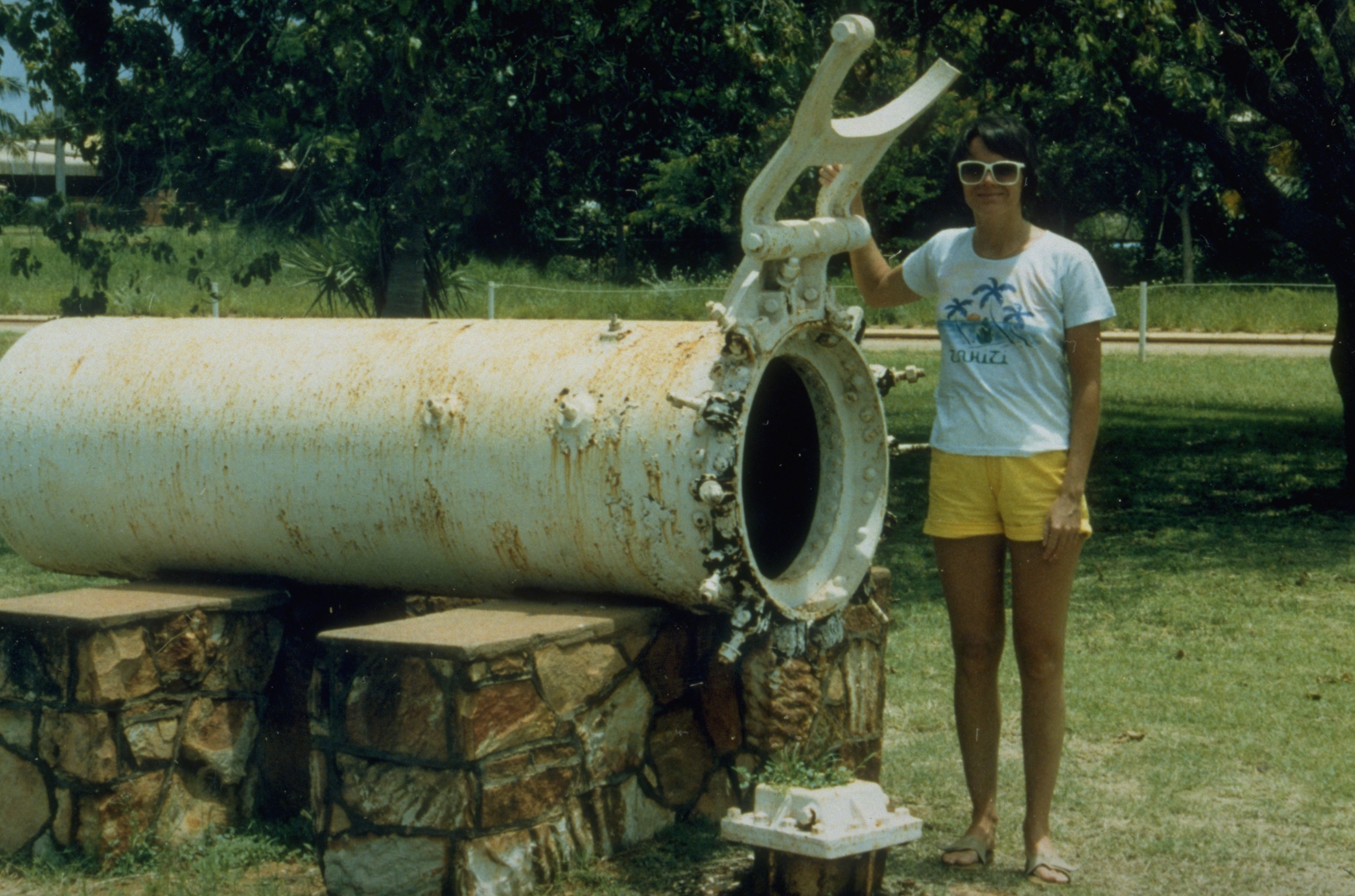
  An early recompression chamber (door removed for public safety)
- 1908: "The Prevention of Compressed Air Illness" was published by JS Haldane, Boycott and Damant recommending staged decompression. These tables were accepted for use by the Royal Navy.
- 1914–16: Experimental decompression chambers were in use on land and aboard ship.
- 1924: The US Navy published the first standardized recompression procedure.
- 1930s: Albert R Behnke separated the symptoms of Arterial Gas Embolism (AGE) from those of DCS.
- 1935: Behnke et al. experimented with oxygen for recompression therapy.
- 1937: Behnke introduced the "no-stop" decompression tables.
- 1941: Altitude DCS is treated with hyperbaric oxygen for the first time.
- 1944: US Navy published hyperbaric treatment tables "Long Air Recompression Table with Oxygen" and "Short Oxygen Recompression Table", both using 100% oxygen at pressures of 60 fsw (18 msw) and less.
- 1945: Field results showed that the 1944 oxygen treatment table was not yet satisfactory, so a series of tests was conducted by staff from the Navy Medical Research Institute and the Navy Experimental Diving Unit using human subjects to verify and modify the treatment tables. Tests were conducted using the 100-foot air-oxygen treatment table and the 100-foot air treatment table, which were found to be satisfactory. Other tables were extended until they produced satisfactory results. The resulting tables were used as the standard treatment for the next 20 years, and these tables and slight modifications were adopted by other navies and industry. Over time, evidence accumulated that the success of these tables for severe decompression sickness was not very good.
- 1957: Robert Workman established a new method for calculation of decompression requirements (M-values).
- 1959: The "SOS Decompression Meter", a submersible mechanical device that simulated nitrogen uptake and release, was introduced.
- 1960: FC Golding et al. split the classification of DCS into Types 1 and 2.
- 1965: Low success rates of the existing US Navy treatment tables led to the development of the oxygen treatment table by Goodman and Workman in 1965, variations of which are still in general use as the definitive treatment for most cases of decompression sickness.
- 1965: LeMessurier and Hills published a paper on A thermodynamic approach arising from a study on Torres Strait diving techniques which suggests that decompression by conventional models results in bubble formation, which is then eliminated by re-dissolving at the decompression stops.
- 1976: M.P. Spencer showed that the sensitivity of decompression testing is increased by the use of ultrasonic methods, which can detect mobile venous bubbles before symptoms of DCS emerge.
- 1982: Paul K Weathersby, Louis D Homer and Edward T Flynn introduce survival analysis into the study of decompression sickness.
- 1983: Orca produced the "EDGE", a personal dive computer, using a microprocessor to calculate nitrogen absorption for twelve tissue compartments.
- 1984: Albert A Bühlmann released his book "Decompression–Decompression Sickness", which detailed his deterministic model for calculation of decompression schedules.
- 1989: The advent of dive computers had not been widely accepted, but after the 1989 AAUS Dive computer workshop published a group consensus list of recommendations for the use of dive computers in scientific diving, most opposition to dive computers dissipated, numerous new models were introduced, the technology dramatically improved and dive computers became standard scuba diving equipment. Over time, some of the recommendations became irrelevant as the technology improved.
- 2000: HydroSpace Engineering developed the HS Explorer, a Trimix computer with optional P_{O_{2}} monitoring and twin decompression algorithms, Buhlmann, and the first full real-time RGBM implementation.
- 2001: The US Navy approved the use of Cochran NAVY decompression computer with the VVAL 18 Thalmann algorithm for Special Warfare operations.
- By 2010: The use of dive computers for decompression status tracking was virtually ubiquitous among recreational divers and widespread in scientific diving.
- 2018: A group of diving medical experts issued a consensus guideline on pre-hospital decompression sickness management and concluded that in-water recompression is a valid and effective emergency treatment where a chamber is not available, but is only appropriate in groups that have been trained and are competent in the skills required for IWR and have appropriate equipment.
- 2023: The animal rights group, PETA, says that it has successfully lobbied the US Navy to end a pair of studies that involved subjecting sheep to conditions that simulated surfacing quickly from a great depth, causing them pain and sometimes leaving the animals paralyzed or dead.

== Society and culture ==
=== Economics ===
In the United States, it is common for medical insurance not to cover treatment for the bends that is the result of recreational diving. This is because scuba diving is considered an elective and "high-risk" activity, and treatment for decompression sickness is expensive. A typical stay in a recompression chamber will easily cost several thousand dollars, even before emergency transportation is included. As of September 2023, a number of hyperbaric chambers in the US are turning divers with decompression sickness away, and only treating more profitable scheduled cases. The number of hyperbaric medical facilities in the US is estimated at about 1500, of which 67 are treating diving accidents, according to Divers Alert Network. Many facilities only provide hyperbaric treatment for wound care for economic reasons. Emergency hyperbaric services are more expensive to train and staff, and liability is increased.

In the United Kingdom, treatment of DCS is provided by the National Health Service. This may occur either at a specialised facility or at a hyperbaric centre based within a general hospital.

== Other animals ==
Animals may also contract DCS, especially those caught in nets and rapidly brought to the surface. It has been documented in loggerhead turtles and likely in prehistoric marine animals as well. Modern reptiles are susceptible to DCS, and there is some evidence that marine mammals such as cetaceans and seals may also be affected. AW Carlsen has suggested that the presence of a right-left shunt in the reptilian heart may account for the predisposition in the same way as a patent foramen ovale does in humans.

== See also ==
- Aviation medicine – Medicine for pilots, aircrews, or astronauts
- Decompression (diving) – Pressure reduction and its effects during ascent from depth
- Decompression illness – Disorders arising from ambient pressure reduction
- Decompression theory – Theoretical modelling of decompression physiology
- Diving disorders – Physiological disorders resulting from underwater diving
- Diving medicine – Diagnosis, treatment and prevention of disorders caused by underwater diving
- Gas bubble disease – Disorder in fish caused by dissolved gases forming bubbles in tissues
- Hyperbaric medicine – Medical treatment at raised ambient pressure
- Hyperbaric treatment schedules – Planned hyperbaric exposure using a specified breathing gas as medical treatment
- Inner ear decompression sickness – Medical condition caused by inert gas bubbles forming out of solution
- In-water recompression – In-water treatment for decompression sickness
- Taravana – Decompression sickness caused by breath-hold diving
