= Gas bubble disease =

Disorder in fish caused by dissolved gases forming bubbles in tissues

Gas bubble disease is a disease of fish that are exposed to water supersaturated with natural gases like oxygen, carbon dioxide, or nitrogen. Bubbles of gas may form in the eyes, skin, gills, and fins. It becomes prominent whenever there is a change in temperature and pressure in environments, aquatic turbulence, and a disturbance in biotic metabolisms.

== Signs and symptoms ==
Gas bubble disease can be detected by the formation of small gas bubbles under the epidermis which includes the formation of gas bubbles in the skin, the gills and eyeballs causing exophtalmia. Gas bubbles may also form in extremities (fins), in the vascular system where they often cause embolism and in their mouth opening. The gas bubble disease may cause floating problems due to the excessive amount of gas in their bodies, ultimately leading to upside-down swimming and death.

Gas bubble disease may also occur in humans and is commonly known as decompression sickness. It generally occurs in divers when they resurface without using proper decompression procedures. The supersaturation of nitrogen in the body tissues is causing an unbalanced gas saturation in blood vessels and organs. The main concern with this disease in particular is when it develops and transforms into air embolism, which causes severe blockades in the lung and in the blood vessels, which is especially dangerous in arteries. Expanding gases can rupture the small air-cavities located in the lungs (alveoli), thus causing pulmonary barotrauma which can ultimately lead to death due to pulmonary failure.

== Origin and causes ==
The gas bubble disease is a result of an over-saturation of nitrogen or other gases in the body tissues caused by a supersaturation of gases in the water. This supersaturation is mainly caused by the changes of abiotic environmental factors including pressure, temperature and salinity since these factors influence the amount of gases dissolving in water.

=== Pressure ===
The decrease in the pressure of the environment will causes the supersaturation of the water.

=== Temperature ===
An increase in temperature of the environment will cause a supersaturation of the water.

=== Salinity ===
An increase in salinity of water may cause gas supersaturation. Therefore, a difference in the salinity levels of lakes or rivers is one of the causes of the gas bubble disease.

=== Other natural causes ===
Other natural causes of gas bubble disease the gas saturation caused by an increase of the concentration of nitrogen in natural water resources due to the increasing nitrogen concentration in underground rivers and lakes or the supersaturation of water caused by cascades or waterfalls. When the water falls into the pool it is forcing the nitrogen into the water of the pool.

== Diagnosis ==
"The resulting abnormal physical presence of gases can block blood vessels (hemostasis) or tear tissues, and may result in death" (Bouck 2011).

Gas bubble disease may develop in three different stages:

- Pressure unequilibrium resulting in excess gas formation.
- Metabolic and functional system decreases.
- Complete system dysfunction (death).

== Prevention ==
The gas bubble disease can generally be prevented by avoiding the factor that cause the disease.

Small gas bubbles in fish can be prevented and somewhat cured by relocating fish into deep water that contains higher pressures and therefore a higher amount of gases can be dissolved in the water. This will cause nitrogen excess to be dissolved into the body tissues and the gas bubbles will eventually disappear.

Aeration is an effective method to stabilise nitrogen and oxygen in water, since it is able to absorb equal quantities of oxygen and nitrogen and forces them into the water to maintain a balance for "rearing fish" (Rucker, 1972).
