= Isobaric counterdiffusion =

Gaseous diffusion through body tissue at constant total pressure

In physiology, isobaric counterdiffusion (ICD) is the diffusion of different gases into and out of tissues while under a constant ambient pressure, after a change of gas composition, and the physiological effects of this phenomenon. The term inert gas counterdiffusion is sometimes used as a synonym, but can also be applied to situations where the ambient pressure changes. It has relevance in mixed gas diving and anesthesiology.

== Background ==
Isobaric counterdiffusion was first described by Graves, Idicula, Lambertsen, and Quinn in 1973 in subjects who breathed one gas mixture (in which the inert component was nitrogen or neon) while being surrounded by another (helium based).

== Clinical relevance ==
In medicine, ICD is the diffusion of gases in different directions that can increase the pressure inside open air spaces of the body and surrounding equipment.

An example of this would be a patient breathing nitrous oxide in an operating room (surrounded by air). Cuffs on the endotracheal tubes must be monitored as nitrous oxide will diffuse into the air filled space causing the volume to increase. In laparoscopic surgery, nitrous oxide is avoided since the gas will diffuse into the abdominal or pelvic cavities causing an increase in internal pressure. In the case of a tympanoplasty, the skin flap will not lay down as the nitrous oxide will be diffusing into the middle ear.

== Relevance to diving ==
In underwater diving, ICD is the diffusion of one inert gas into body tissues while another inert gas is diffusing out. While not strictly speaking a phenomenon of decompression, it is a complication that can occur during decompression, and that can result in the formation or growth of bubbles without changes in the environmental pressure. If the gas that is diffusing into a tissue does so at a rate which exceeds the rate of the other leaving the tissue, it can raise the combined gas concentration in the tissue to a supersaturation sufficient to cause the formation or growth of bubbles, without changes in the environmental pressure, and in particular, without concurrent decompression. Two forms of this phenomenon have been described by Lambertsen:

=== Superficial ICD ===
Superficial ICD (also known as Steady State Isobaric Counterdiffusion) occurs when the inert gas breathed by the diver diffuses more slowly into the body than the inert gas surrounding the body.

An example of this would be breathing air in a heliox environment. The helium in the heliox diffuses into the skin quickly, while the nitrogen diffuses more slowly from the capillaries to the skin and out of the body. The resulting effect generates supersaturation in certain sites of the superficial tissues and the formation of inert gas bubbles. These isobaric skin lesions (urticaria) do not occur when the ambient gas is nitrogen and the breathing gas is helium.

=== Deep tissue ICD ===
Deep tissue ICD (also known as Transient Isobaric Counterdiffusion) occurs when different inert gases are breathed by the diver in sequence. The rapidly diffusing gas is transported into the tissue faster than the slower diffusing gas is transported out of the tissue.

An example of this was shown in the literature by Harvey in 1977 as divers switched from a nitrogen mixture to a helium mixture (diffusivity of helium is 2.65 times faster than nitrogen), they quickly developed itching followed by joint pain. Saturation divers breathing hydreliox switched to a heliox mixture and developed symptoms of decompression sickness during Hydra V. In 2003 Doolette and Mitchell described ICD as the basis for inner ear decompression sickness and suggest "breathing-gas switches should be scheduled deep or shallow to avoid the period of maximum supersaturation resulting from decompression". It can also happen when saturation divers breathing hydreliox switch to a heliox mixture.

There is another effect which can manifest as a result of the disparity in solubility between inert breathing gas diluents, which occurs in isobaric gas switches near the decompression ceiling between a low solubility gas (typically helium), and a higher solubility gas (typically nitrogen).

An inner ear decompression model by Doolette and Mitchell suggests that a transient increase in gas tension after a switch from helium to nitrogen in breathing gas may result from the difference in gas transfer between compartments. If the transport of nitrogen into the vascular compartment by perfusion exceeds removal of helium by perfusion, while transfer of helium into the vascular compartment by diffusion from the perilymph and endolymph exceeds the counterdiffusion of nitrogen, this may result in a temporary increase in total gas tension, as the input of nitrogen exceeds the removal of helium, which can result in bubble formation and growth. This model suggests that diffusion of gases from the middle ear across the round window is negligible. The model is not necessarily applicable to all tissue types.

=== ICD prevention ===
Lambertsen made suggestions to help avoid ICD while diving. If the diver is surrounded by or saturated with nitrogen, they should not breathe helium rich gases. Lambertsen also proposed that gas switches that involve going from helium rich mixtures to nitrogen rich mixtures would be acceptable, but changes from nitrogen to helium should include recompression. However Doolette and Mitchell's more recent study of inner ear decompression sickness (IEDCS) now shows that the inner ear may not be well-modelled by common (e.g. Bühlmann) algorithms. Doolette and Mitchell propose that a switch from a helium-rich mix to a nitrogen-rich mix, as is common in technical diving when switching from trimix to nitrox on ascent, may cause a transient supersaturation of inert gas within the inner ear and result in IEDCS. A similar hypothesis to explain the incidence of IEDCS when switching from trimix to nitrox was proposed by Steve Burton, who considered the effect of the much greater solubility of nitrogen than helium in producing transient increases in total inert gas pressure, which could lead to DCS under isobaric conditions. Recompression with oxygen is effective for relief of symptoms resulting from ICD. However, Burton's model for IEDCS does not agree with Doolette and Mitchell's model of the inner ear. Doolette and Mitchell model the inner ear using solubility coefficients close to that of water. They suggest that breathing-gas switches from helium-rich to nitrogen-rich mixtures should be carefully scheduled either deep (with due consideration to nitrogen narcosis) or shallow to avoid the period of maximum supersaturation resulting from the decompression. Switches should also be made during breathing of the largest inspired oxygen partial pressure that can be safely tolerated with due consideration to oxygen toxicity.

A similar hypothesis to explain the incidence of IEDCS when switching from trimix to nitrox was proposed by Steve Burton, who considered the effect of the much greater solubility of nitrogen than helium in producing transient increases in total inert gas pressure, which could lead to DCS under isobaric conditions.

Burton argues that effect of switching to Nitrox from Trimix with a large increase of nitrogen fraction at constant pressure has the effect of increasing the overall gas loading within particularly the faster tissues, since the loss of helium is more than compensated by the increase in nitrogen. This could cause immediate bubble formation and growth in the fast tissues. A simple rule for avoidance of ICD when gas switching at a decompression ceiling is suggested:

- Any increase in gas fraction of nitrogen in the decompression gas should be limited to 1/5 of the decrease in gas fraction of helium.

This rule has been found to successfully avoid ICD on hundreds of deep trimix dives.

== See also ==
- Decompression sickness – Disorder caused by dissolved gases forming bubbles in tissues
- Decompression theory – Theoretical modelling of decompression physiology
- Inner ear decompression sickness – Medical condition caused by inert gas bubbles forming out of solution
