= Orca Edge =

First commercially viable personal decompression computer

- Uses: Monitoring decompression status of a scuba diver
- Inventor: Craig Barshinger, Karl Huggins, Paul Heinmuller
- Manufacturer: Orca
- Model: Edge

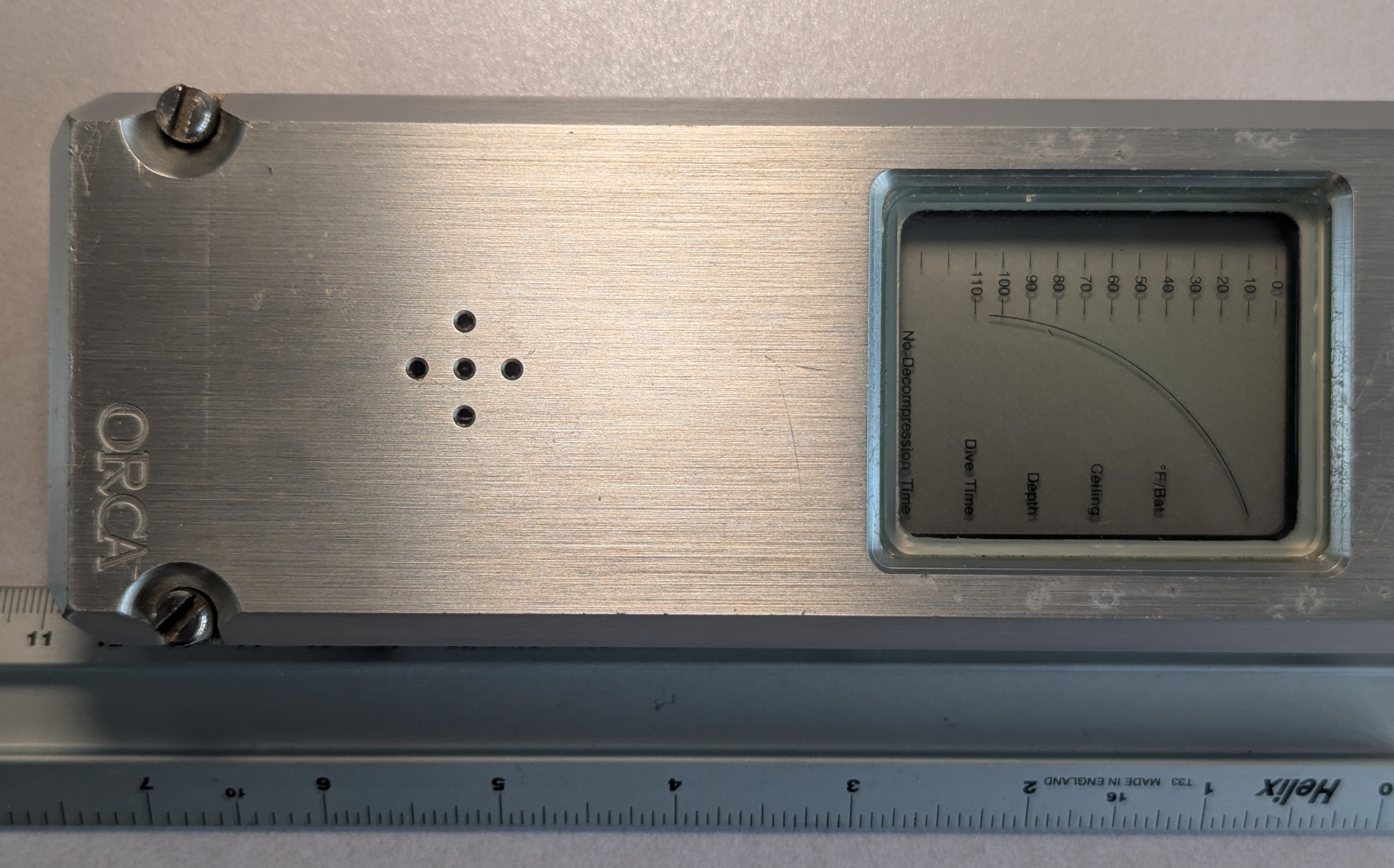
Orca Edge dive computer

The Orca Edge was the first commercially viable recreational diving personal decompression computer.

The Orca Edge was an early example of a dive computer that ran a real time algorithm. Designed by Craig Barshinger, Karl E. Huggins and Paul Heinmiller, the Edge did not display a decompression plan, but instead showed the decompression ceiling or the so-called "safe-ascent-depth" and a graphic display of calculated tissue gas loadings. A drawback was that if the diver was faced by a ceiling, he did not know how long he would have to decompress. The Edge's large, unique display, however, featuring 12 tissue bars permitted experienced users to make a reasonable estimate of their decompression obligation.

In the 1980s the relevant technology improved rapidly. In 1983 the Orca Edge became available as the first commercially viable dive computer. The model was based on the US Navy dive tables but did not calculate a decompression plan. However, production capacity was only one unit a day.

The Edge was introduced to the diving industry at DEMA in January 1983, while testing was still ongoing, with mixed reactions. Some thought it was a good tool for diver safety and convenience, others considered it dangerous. Over time it developed a good record and reputation.

== History ==
During a year off from studies, Huggins trained as a diving instructor, and later assisted on an instructor training program with Dan Orr and Lee Somers at Wright State University, during which he gave a lecture on decompression models and early dive computers, and met Craig Barshinger, who had recently stated a company named Orca to develop and market microprocessor based dive computers. Barshinger approached Huggins to discuss the possibilities.

Barshinger moved to Pennsylvania and started raising capital for Orca. In 1982 he persuaded Huggins to relocate to Pennsylvania and work on the project full-time with him and partner Jim Fulton.

The name was from a suggestion by Dan Orr of Electronic Dive GuidE

The Edge was in full production by 1983 and was introduced at a suggested retail price of $675. Production was slow as the company was undercapitalized. By the time the product was discontinued, slightly more than 10,000 units had been made, and the company had changed ownership several times.

Orca Industries continued to refine their technology with the release of the Skinny-dipper in 1987 to do calculations for repetitive diving. They later released the Delphi computer in 1989 that included calculations for diving at altitude as well as dive profile recording.

== Technology ==
The Edge used microprocessor technology, a graphic screen display and an algorithm based on the one used for the US Navy air decompression tables.

The usual technology of the time was to use a lookup table based on the paper dive tables, but using a real-time computation based on instantaneous pressure allowed the computer to take the actual profile into account far more precisely when calculating tissue gas loading. This development was followed in almost all later dive computers.

The display used bar graphs representing the tissue compartments to indicate decompression status. When the pixels of any of the tissue bars reached a limiting line that tissue had a decompression obligation, and the diver was obliged to stay below the tissue ceiling until it decompressed sufficiently for further safe ascent. This graphic system did not give a required stop time, but was fairly intuitive to use and was well received by most divers that used it.
