= Alternobaric vertigo =

Dizziness resulting from unequal pressures in the middle ears

- Specialty: Otorhinolaryngology, diving medicine

In aviation and underwater diving, alternobaric vertigo is dizziness resulting from unequal pressures being exerted between the inner ears, commonly due to one Eustachian tube being less patent than the other.

== Causes ==
This might have occurred due to barotrauma of descent, and/or the effects of nasal decongestants. It is due to unequal increase in middle ear pressures on ascent, is usually mild, and most often cleared by further ascent. When the pressures in both ears reach ambient levels, the stimulus for the dizziness stops. Although most often mild, the vertigo can persist until the diver reaches the surface continuing the unequal pressures, which can damage the inner ear or ear drum.

Alternobaric vertigo is most pronounced when the diver is in the vertical position; the spinning is towards the ear with the higher pressure and tends to develop when the pressures differ by 60 cm of water or more. Ear clearing may be a remedy. A similar vertigo can also occur as a result of unequal heating stimulation of one inner ear labyrinth over the other due to diving in a prone position in cold water - the undermost ear being stimulated.

== Diagnosis ==
In terms of diagnosis for alternobaric vertigo the medical history and physical examination, are important. Furthermore, Eustachian tube function testing is also performed

== See also ==
- Vertigo – Dizziness with sensation of moving or surrounding objects moving
- Inner ear barotrauma – Pressure injury to the inner ear
- Inner ear decompression sickness – Medical condition caused by inert gas bubbles forming out of solution
