= Oxygen window =

Difference between the partial pressures of oxygen in arterial blood and body tissues

In diving and decompression, the oxygen window is the difference between the partial pressure of oxygen (P_{O_{2}}) in arterial blood and the P_{O_{2}} in body tissues. It is caused by metabolic consumption of oxygen.

== Description ==
The term "oxygen window" was first used by Albert R. Behnke in 1967. Behnke refers to early work by Momsen on "partial pressure vacancy" (PPV) where he used partial pressures of oxygen and helium as high as 2–3 ATA to create a maximal PPV. Behnke then goes on to describe "isobaric inert gas transport" or "inherent unsaturation" as termed by LeMessurier and Hills and separately by Hills, who made their independent observations at the same time. Van Liew et al. also made a similar observation that they did not name at the time. The clinical significance of their work was later shown by Sass.

The oxygen window effect in decompression is described in diving medical texts and the limits reviewed by Van Liew et al. in 1993.

When living animals are in steady state, the sum of the partial pressures of dissolved gases in the tissues is usually less than atmospheric pressure, a phenomenon known as the "oxygen window", "partial pressure vacancy" or "inherent unsaturation". This is because metabolism lowers partial pressure of O_{2} in tissue below the value in arterial blood and the binding of O_{2} by hemoglobin causes a relatively large P_{O_{2}} difference between tissues and arterial blood. Production of CO_{2} is usually about the same as consumption of O_{2} on a mole-for-mole basis, but there is little rise of P_{CO_{2}} because of its high effective solubility. Levels of O_{2} and CO_{2} in tissue can influence blood flow and thereby influence washout of dissolved inert gas, but the magnitude of the oxygen window has no direct effect on inert-gas washout. The oxygen window provides a tendency for absorption of the gas quantities in the body such as pneumothoraces or decompression sickness (DCS) bubbles. With DCS bubbles, the window is a major factor in the rate of bubble shrinkage when the subject is in a steady state, modifies bubble dynamics when inert gas is being taken up or given off by the tissues, and may sometimes prevent the transformation of bubble nuclei into stable bubbles.

— This passage is quoted from Van Liew's technical note:

Van Liew et al. describe the measurements important to evaluating the oxygen window as well as simplify the "assumptions available for the existing complex anatomical and physiological situation to provide calculations, over a wide range of exposures, of the oxygen window".

== Background ==
Oxygen is used to decrease the time needed for safe decompression in diving, but the practical consequences and benefits need further research. Decompression is still far from being an exact science, and divers when diving deep must make many decisions based on personal experience rather than scientific knowledge.

In technical diving, applying the oxygen window effect by using decompression gases with high P_{O_{2}} increases decompression efficiency and allows shorter decompression stops. Reducing decompression time can be important to reduce time spent at shallow depths in open water (avoiding dangers such as water currents and boat traffic), and to reduce the physical stress imposed on the diver.

== Mechanism ==
The oxygen window does not increase the rate of offgassing for a given concentration gradient of inert gas, but it reduces the risk of bubble formation and growth which depends on the total dissolved gas tension. Increased rate of offgassing is achieved by providing a larger gradient. The lower risk of bubble formation at a given gradient allows the increase of gradient without excessive risk of bubble formation. In other words, the larger oxygen window due to a higher oxygen partial pressure can allow the diver to decompress faster at a shallower stop at the same risk, or at the same rate at the same depth at a lower risk, or at an intermediate rate at an intermediate depth at an intermediate risk.

== Application ==
Use of 100% oxygen is limited by oxygen toxicity at deeper depths. Convulsions are more likely when the P_{O_{2}} exceeds 1.6 bar (160 kPa). Technical divers use gas mixes with high P_{O_{2}} in some sectors of the decompression schedule. As an example, a popular decompression gas is 50% nitrox on decompression stops starting at 21 metres (69 ft).

Where to add the high P_{O_{2}} gas in the schedule depends on what limits of P_{O_{2}} are accepted as safe, and on the diver's opinion on the level of added efficiency. Many technical divers have chosen to lengthen the decompression stops where P_{O_{2}} is high and to push gradient at the shallower decompression stops.

Nevertheless, much is still unknown about how long this extension should be and the level of decompression efficiency gained. At least four variables of decompression are relevant in discussing how long high P_{O_{2}} decompression stops should be:

- Time needed for circulation and elimination of gas through the lungs;
- The vasoconstrictor effect (reduction of the size of blood vessels) of oxygen, reducing decompression efficiency when blood vessels start contracting;
- The threshold depth where the critical tissue compartments start off-gassing rather than in-gassing.
- Cumulative effect of acute oxygen toxicity.

== Extended oxygen window ==
The concept of partial unsaturation in tissues has been extended to saturation decompression. At the beginning of decompression from saturation the amount of unsaturation in the tissues allows a faster rate of decompression through the oxygen window, which is proportional to the partial pressure of oxygen in the breathing gas. Kot et al. have hypothesised that the oxygen window originally defined by Behnke as 60 torr (in air) can be extended by about 90 torr contributed by water vapour tension, as it does not contribute to bubble creation, and part of the carbon dioxide partial pressure, as it is highly soluble and chemically active.

After the initial decompression through the oxygen window, the safe rate of decompression is limited by the slowest tissue, generally taken to be 360 minutes half time. This concept has been used in calculating the Polish saturation decompression tables.

== See also ==
- Decompression (diving) – Pressure reduction and its effects during ascent from depth
- Decompression theory – Theoretical modelling of decompression physiology
- Hyperbaric medicine – Medical treatment at raised ambient pressure
- Human physiology of underwater diving – Influences of the underwater environment on the physiology of human divers
- Saturation diving – Diving mode and decompression technique
- Technical diving – Diving beyond the scope of recreational diving
