= Decompression (diving) =

Pressure reduction and its effects during ascent from depth

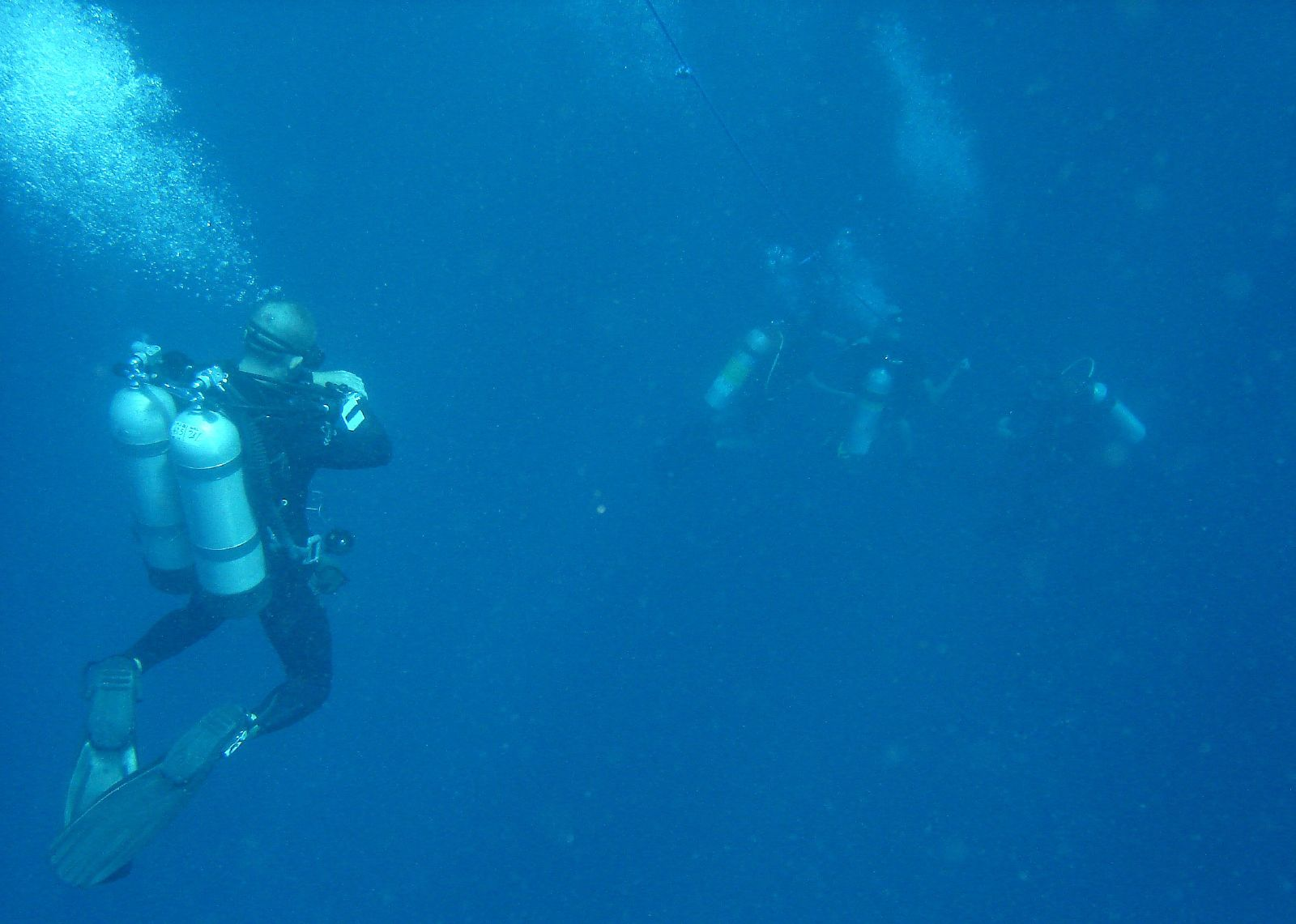
Divers decompressing in the water at the end of a dive

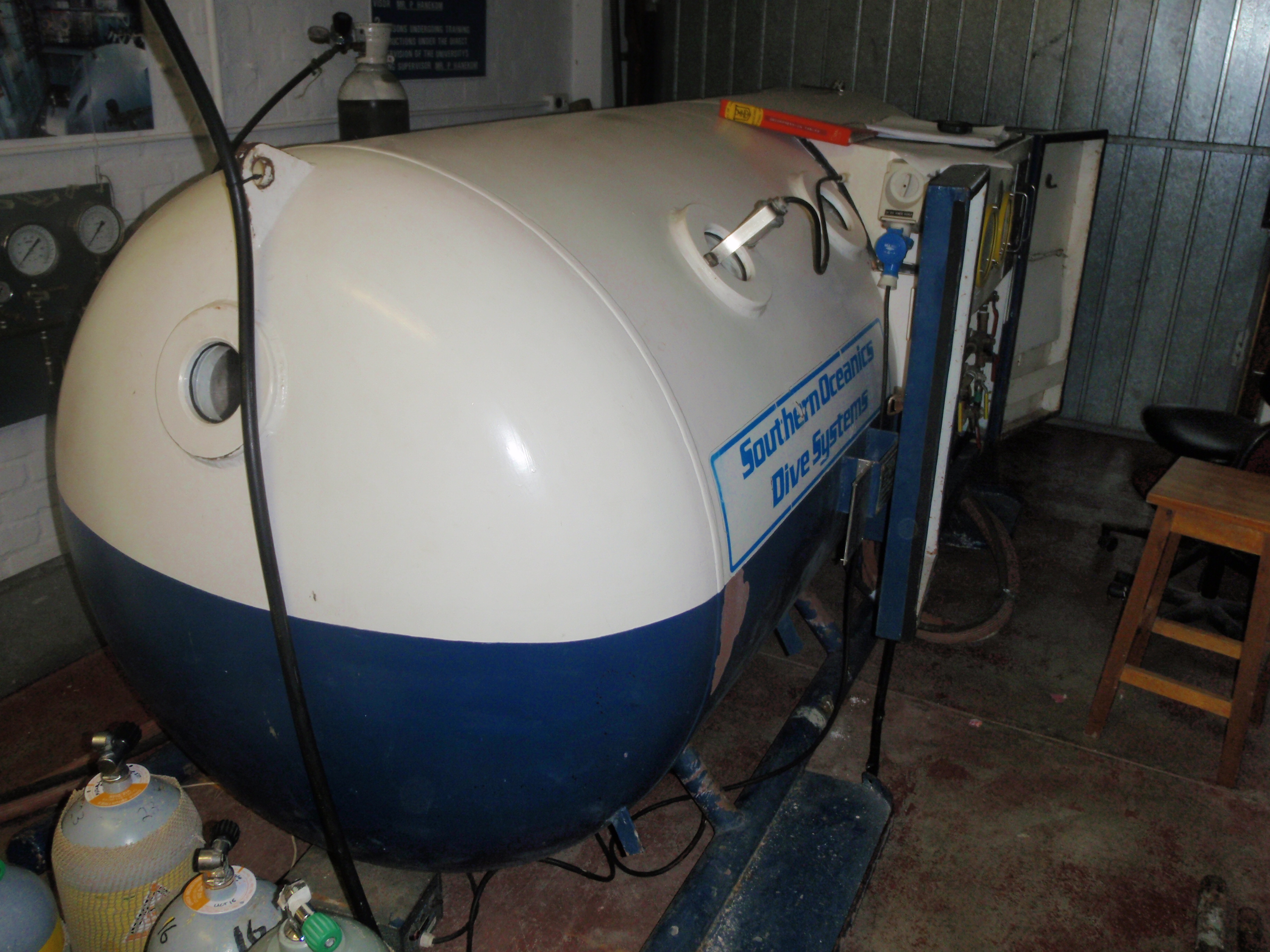
Basic deck decompression chamber

The decompression of a diver is the reduction in ambient pressure experienced during ascent from depth or depressurisation of a diving chamber. It is also the process of elimination of dissolved metabolically inert gases from the diver's body tissues which accumulated during the dive. Gas elimination also occurs during pauses in the ascent known as decompression stops, where the pressure is held constant, and after surfacing, until the gas concentrations reach equilibrium. Divers breathing gas at ambient pressure need to ascend at a rate determined by their recent exposure to pressure and the breathing gas in use. A diver who only breathes gas at atmospheric pressure when free-diving or snorkelling will not usually need to decompress. Divers using an atmospheric diving suit do not need to decompress as they are never exposed to high ambient pressure.

When an ambient pressure diver descends in the water, the hydrostatic pressure, and therefore the ambient pressure, rises. Because breathing gas is supplied at ambient pressure, some of this gas dissolves into the diver's blood and is transferred by the blood to other tissues where it may accumulate by diffusion. Inert gas such as nitrogen or helium continues to be taken up until the gas dissolved in the diver is in a state of equilibrium with the breathing gas in the diver's lungs, at which point the diver is saturated for that depth and breathing mixture, or the depth, and therefore the pressure, is changed, or the partial pressures of the gases are changed by modifying the breathing gas mixture. During ascent, the ambient pressure is reduced, and at some stage the inert gases dissolved in any given tissue will be at a higher concentration than the equilibrium state and start to diffuse out again to the blood and be eliminated in the lungs. If pressure reduction occurs too quickly, this excess gas may form bubbles, which may lead to decompression sickness, a possibly debilitating or life-threatening condition. It is essential that divers manage their decompression to avoid excessive bubble formation and decompression sickness. A mismanaged decompression usually results from reducing the ambient pressure too quickly for the amount of gas in solution to be eliminated safely. These bubbles may block arterial blood supply to tissues or directly cause tissue damage. If the decompression is effective, the asymptomatic venous microbubbles present after most dives are eliminated from the diver's body in the alveolar capillary beds of the lungs. If they are not given enough time, or more bubbles are created than can be eliminated safely, the bubbles grow in size and number causing the symptoms and injuries of decompression sickness. The immediate goal of controlled decompression is to avoid development of symptoms of bubble formation in the tissues of the diver, and the long-term goal is to avoid complications due to sub-clinical decompression injury.

The mechanisms of bubble formation and the damage bubbles cause has been the subject of medical research for a considerable time and several hypotheses have been advanced and tested. Tables and algorithms for predicting the outcome of decompression schedules for specified hyperbaric exposures have been proposed, tested and used, and in many cases, superseded. Although constantly refined and generally considered acceptably reliable, the actual outcome for any individual diver remains slightly unpredictable. Although decompression retains some risk, this is now generally considered acceptable for dives within the well tested range of normal recreational and professional diving.

Decompression may be continuous or staged. A staged decompression ascent is interrupted by decompression stops at specified depth intervals, but the entire ascent is actually part of the decompression and the ascent rate is important for harmless elimination of inert gas. A no-decompression dive, or more accurately, a dive with no-stop decompression, relies on limiting the ascent rate for avoidance of excessive bubble formation in the fastest tissues. The elapsed time at surface pressure immediately after a dive is known as the surface interval, is also an important part of decompression, and can be thought of as the last decompression stop of a dive. It can take up to 24 hours for the body to return to its normal atmospheric levels of inert gas saturation after a dive.

== Decompression theory ==
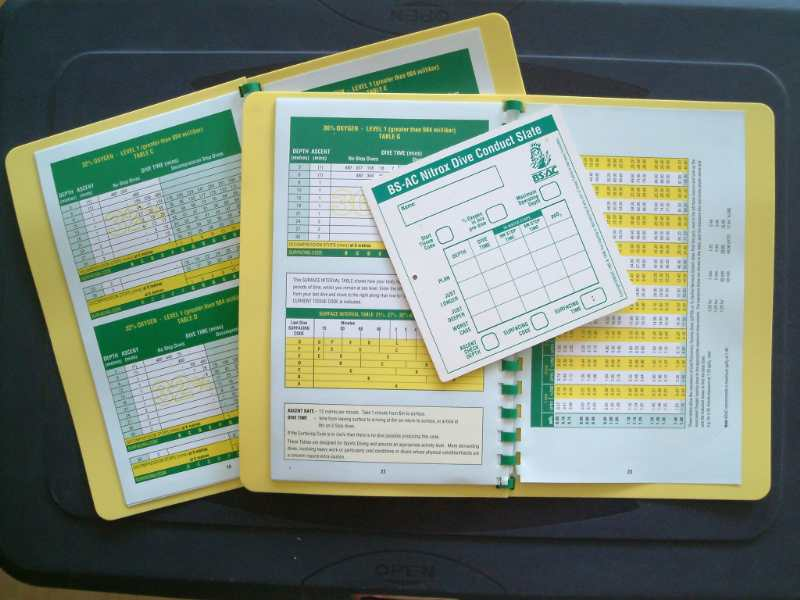
Recreational decompression tables printed on plastic cards

Decompression theory is the study and modelling of the transfer of the inert gas component of breathing gases from the gas in the lungs to the tissues of the diver and back during exposure to variations in ambient pressure. In the case of underwater diving and compressed air work, this mostly involves ambient pressures greater than the local surface pressure—but astronauts, high altitude mountaineers, and occupants of unpressurised aircraft, are exposed to ambient pressures less than standard sea level atmospheric pressure. In all cases, the symptoms of decompression sickness occur during or within a relatively short period of hours, or occasionally days, after a significant reduction of ambient pressure.

=== Physics and physiology of decompression ===
The absolute pressure on an ambient pressure diver is the sum of the local atmospheric pressure and hydrostatic pressure. Hydrostatic pressure is the component of ambient pressure due to the weight of the water column above the depth, and is commonly described in terms of metres or feet of sea water.

The ambient pressure of the water is transmitted to the diver by direct contact with the skin and indirect contact through the divers suit and soft equipment. The soft tissues are incompressible and the pressure is transferred through them to any gas spaces. Since gases are compressible they will be compressed until the pressure is balanced. In the case of a breath-hold diver the lungs and upper airways must reduce in volume to compress their gaseous contents to balance the pressure in the walls of the gas spaces. If the spaces are not sufficiently compliant, fluids will accumulate in the adjacent tissues, which may be damaged, resulting in oedema and possibly internal haemorrhage. When the diver has an ambient pressure breathing gas supply, ambient pressure gas can flow in to fill the gas space without a forced volume reduction. This inflow of ambient pressure gas is known as pressure equalisation. A similar effect occurs in external gas spaces in contact with the skin or isolated from the body.

The absorption of gases in liquids depends on the solubility of the specific gas in the specific liquid, the concentration of gas, customarily expressed as partial pressure, and temperature. The main variable in the study of decompression theory is pressure.

Once dissolved, distribution of the dissolved gas may be by diffusion, where there is no bulk flow of the solvent, or by perfusion where the solvent (in this case blood) is circulated around the diver's body, where gas can diffuse to local regions of lower concentration. Given sufficient time at a specific partial pressure in the breathing gas, the concentration in the tissues stabilises, or saturates, at a rate that depends on solubility, diffusion rate and perfusion, all of which vary in the different tissues of the body. This process is referred to as in-gassing, and is usually modelled as an inverse exponential process.

If the concentration of the inert gas in the breathing gas is reduced below that of any of the tissues, there is a tendency for gas to return from the tissues to the breathing gas. This is known as out-gassing, and occurs during decompression, when the reduction in ambient pressure reduces the partial pressure of the inert gas in the lungs. This process may be complicated by the formation of gas bubbles, as the modelling of bubbles is more complex and varied.

The combined concentrations of gases in any given tissue depend on the history of pressure and gas composition. Under equilibrium conditions, the total concentration of dissolved gases is less than the ambient pressure—as oxygen is metabolised in the tissues, and the carbon dioxide produced is much more soluble. However, during a reduction in ambient pressure, the rate of pressure reduction may exceed the rate at which gas is eliminated by diffusion and perfusion. If the concentration gets too high, it may reach a stage where bubble formation can occur in the supersaturated tissues. When the pressure of gases in a bubble exceed the combined external pressures of ambient pressure and the surface tension of the bubble-liquid interface, the bubbles grow, and this growth can damage tissue.

If the dissolved inert gases come out of solution within the tissues of the body and form bubbles, they may cause the condition known as decompression sickness, or DCS, also known as divers' disease, the bends or caisson disease. However, not all bubbles result in symptoms, and Doppler bubble detection shows that venous bubbles are present in a significant number of asymptomatic divers after relatively mild hyperbaric exposures.

Since bubbles can form in or migrate to any part of the body, DCS can produce many symptoms, and its effects may vary from joint pain and rashes to paralysis and death. Individual susceptibility can vary from day to day, and different individuals under the same conditions may be affected differently or not at all. The classification of types of DCS by its symptoms has evolved since its original description.

Efficient decompression requires the diver to ascend fast enough to establish as high a decompression gradient, in as many tissues, as safely possible, without provoking the development of symptomatic bubbles. This is facilitated by the highest acceptably safe oxygen partial pressure in the breathing gas, and avoiding gas changes that could cause inert gas counterdiffusion bubble formation or growth. The development of schedules that are both safe and efficient has been complicated by the large number of variables and uncertainties, including personal variation in response under varying environmental conditions and workload.

The risk of decompression sickness after diving can be managed through effective decompression procedures and contracting it is now uncommon, though it remains to some degree unpredictable. Its potential severity has driven much research to prevent it and divers almost universally use decompression tables or dive computers to limit or monitor their exposure and to control their ascent rate and decompression procedures. If DCS is contracted, it is usually treated by hyperbaric oxygen therapy in a recompression chamber. If treated early, there is a significantly higher chance of successful recovery.

A diver who only breathes gas at atmospheric pressure when free-diving or snorkelling will not usually need to decompress but it is possible to get a form of decompression sickness, called taravana, from repetitive deep free-diving with short surface intervals.

=== Decompression models ===
Actual rates of diffusion and perfusion, and solubility of gases in specific physiological tissues are not generally known, and vary considerably. However mathematical models have been proposed that approximate the real situation to a greater or lesser extent. These models predict whether symptomatic bubble formation is likely to occur for a given dive profile. Algorithms based on these models produce decompression tables. In personal dive computers, they produce a real-time estimate of decompression status and display a recommended ascent profile for the diver, which may include decompression stops.

Two different concepts have been used for decompression modelling. The first assumes that dissolved gas is eliminated while in the dissolved phase, and that bubbles are not formed during asymptomatic decompression. The second, which is supported by experimental observation, assumes that bubbles are formed during most asymptomatic decompressions, and that gas elimination must consider both dissolved and bubble phases.

Early decompression models tended to use the dissolved phase models, and adjusted them by factors derived from experimental observations to reduce the risk of symptomatic bubble formation.

There are two main groups of dissolved phase models: In parallel compartment models, several compartments with varying rates of gas absorption (half time), are considered to exist independently of each other, and the limiting condition is controlled by the compartment that shows the worst case for a specific exposure profile. These compartments represent conceptual tissues and do not represent specific organic tissues. They merely represent the range of possibilities for the organic tissues. The second group uses serial compartments, which assumes that gas diffuses through one compartment before it reaches the next.

More recent models attempt to model bubble dynamics, also usually by simplified models, to facilitate the computation of tables, and later to allow real time predictions during a dive. Models that approximate bubble dynamics are varied. They range from those that are not much more complex than the dissolved phase models, to those that require considerably greater computational power. Bubble models have not been experimentally shown to be more efficient, nor to reduce risk of decompression sickness for dives where the bottom profile and total ascent time are the same as for dissolved gas models. Limited experimental work suggests that for some dive profiles the increased ingassing due to deeper stops may cause greater decompression stress in slower tissues with consequent greater venous bubble loading after dives.

== Decompression practice ==
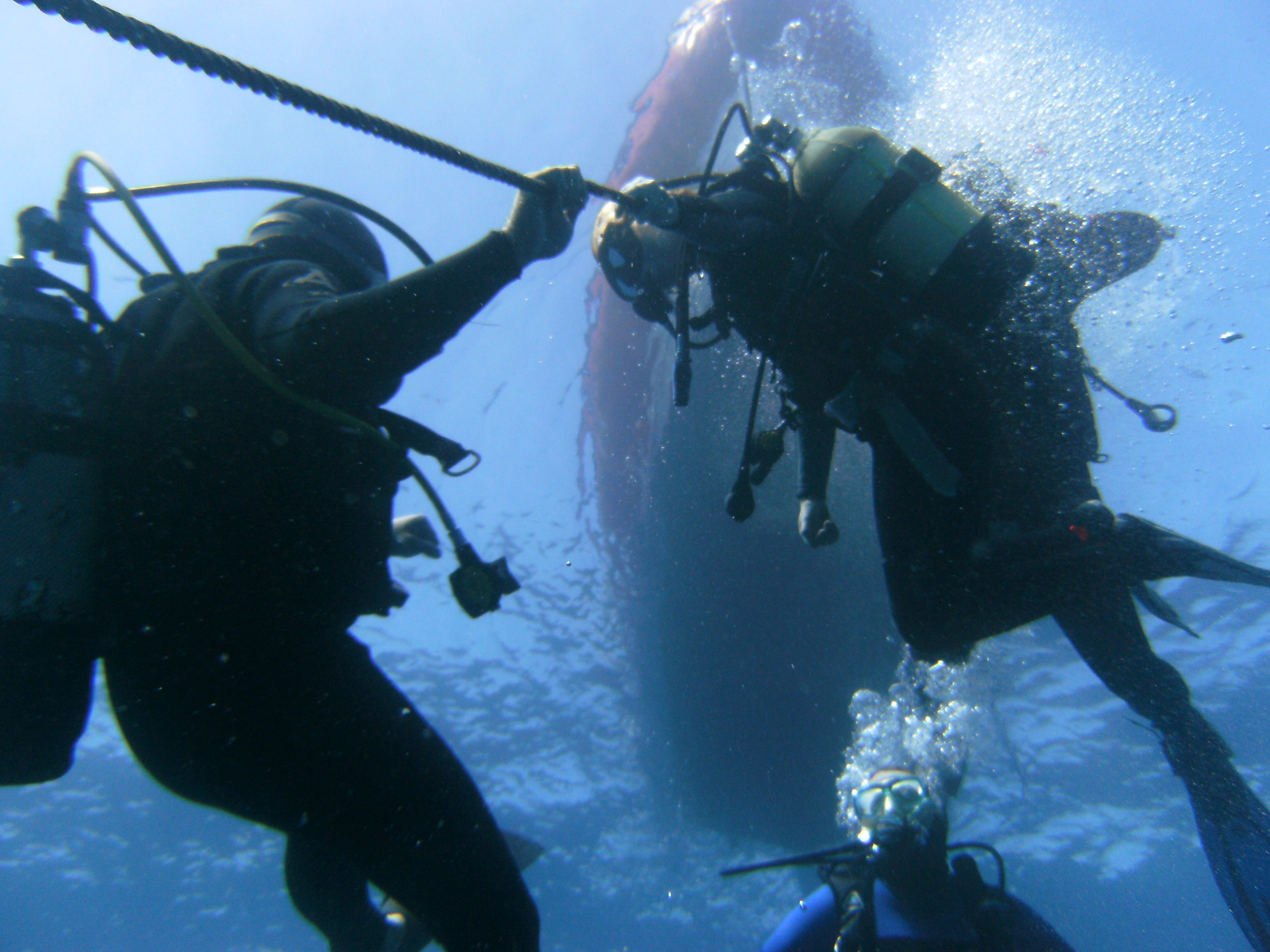
Divers using the anchor cable as an aid to depth control during a decompression stop

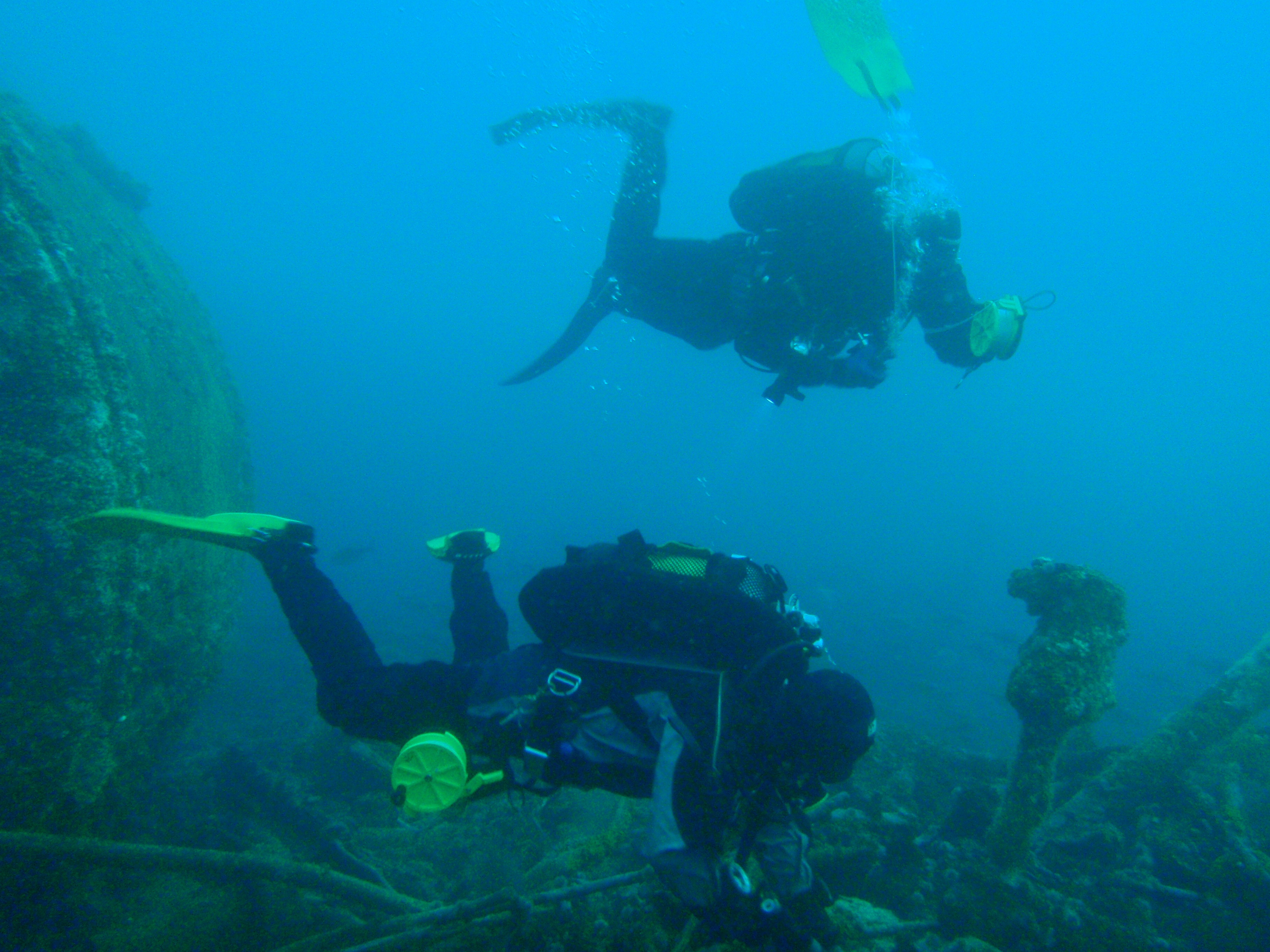
Diver deploying a DSMB

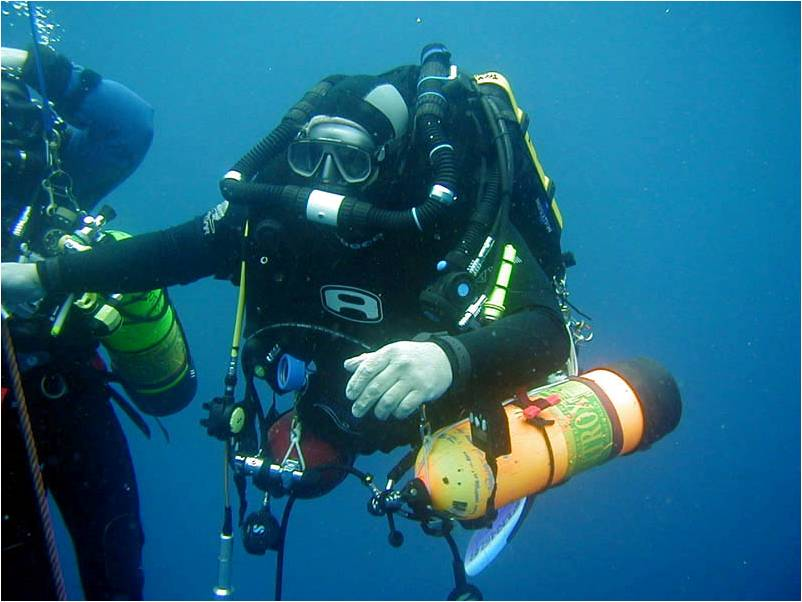
Diver with bailout and decompression cylinders

The practice of decompression by divers comprises the planning, ascent, and monitoring of the ascent profile indicated by the algorithms or tables of the chosen decompression model, use of equipment available and appropriate to the circumstances of the dive, and following the procedures recommended and authorised for the equipment and profile to be used. There is usually a range of options in all of these aspects. There are also constraints on some details of the procedures, such as limiting the ascent rate. Events may occur during ascent that change the initial ascent plan, or affect risk, such as making stops during the ascent additional to the planned decompression stops, or adopting a slower ascent rate. Other behaviour or considerations may affect decompression practice, such as limiting the number of dives performed in a day, limiting the number of days of diving within a week, avoiding dive profiles that have multiple ascents and descents, avoiding heavy work immediately after a dive, or not flying or ascending to altitude after diving until the inert gases have been adequately eliminated.

=== Procedures ===
These are the variety of ways a diver may decompress, depending on the dive profile and the mode of diving used. These may be described as decompression modes. Decompression may be continuous or staged, where the ascent is interrupted by stops at regular depth intervals, but the entire ascent is part of the decompression, and ascent rate can be critical to harmless elimination of inert gas. What is commonly known as no-decompression diving, or more accurately no-stop decompression, relies on limiting ascent rate for avoidance of excessive bubble formation. The procedures used for decompression depend on the mode of diving, the available equipment, the site and environment and the actual dive profile. Standardised procedures have been developed that provide an acceptable level of risk in appropriate circumstances.

Normal diving decompression procedures range from continuous ascent for no-stop dives, where all the necessary decompression occurs during the ascent, which is kept to a controlled rate for this purpose, through staged decompression in open water or in a bell, or following the decompression ceiling, to decompression from saturation, which generally occurs in a decompression chamber that is part of a saturation system. Decompression may be accelerated by the use of breathing gases that provide an increased concentration differential of the inert gas components of the breathing mixture by maximising the acceptable oxygen content, while avoiding problems caused by inert gas counterdiffusion.

Currently many popular decompression procedures advise a 'safety stop' additional to any stops required by the algorithm, usually of about three to five minutes at 3 to 6 metres (10 to 20 ft), particularly on an otherwise continuous no-stop ascent.

Therapeutic recompression is a medical procedure for treatment of decompression sickness, and is followed by decompression to a conservative schedule.

=== Equipment ===
There is a class of diving equipment directly associated with decompression, which includes:

- The decompression tables or software used to plan the dive,
- The equipment used to control and monitor depth and dive time, such as:
  - personal dive computers, depth gauges, and timers, used by scuba divers to monitor ascents,
  - shot lines, surface marker buoys (SMBs), decompression buoys (DSMBs) and decompression trapezes, used by scuba divers to control ascents,
  - diving stages (baskets), wet bells and dry bells, used by surface-supplied divers to control ascents,
  - deck decompression chambers and saturation decompression chambers, used for surface decompression and decompression from saturation. and
  - hyperbaric treatment chambers, used to decompress occupants after hyperbaric treatment.
- The supply of decompression gases, which may be:
  - carried by the diver in a scuba set,
  - supplied from the surface via the diver's umbilical or bell umbilical, or
  - supplied in the chamber at the surface as chamber gas or via built-in breathing systems.

== History of decompression research and development ==
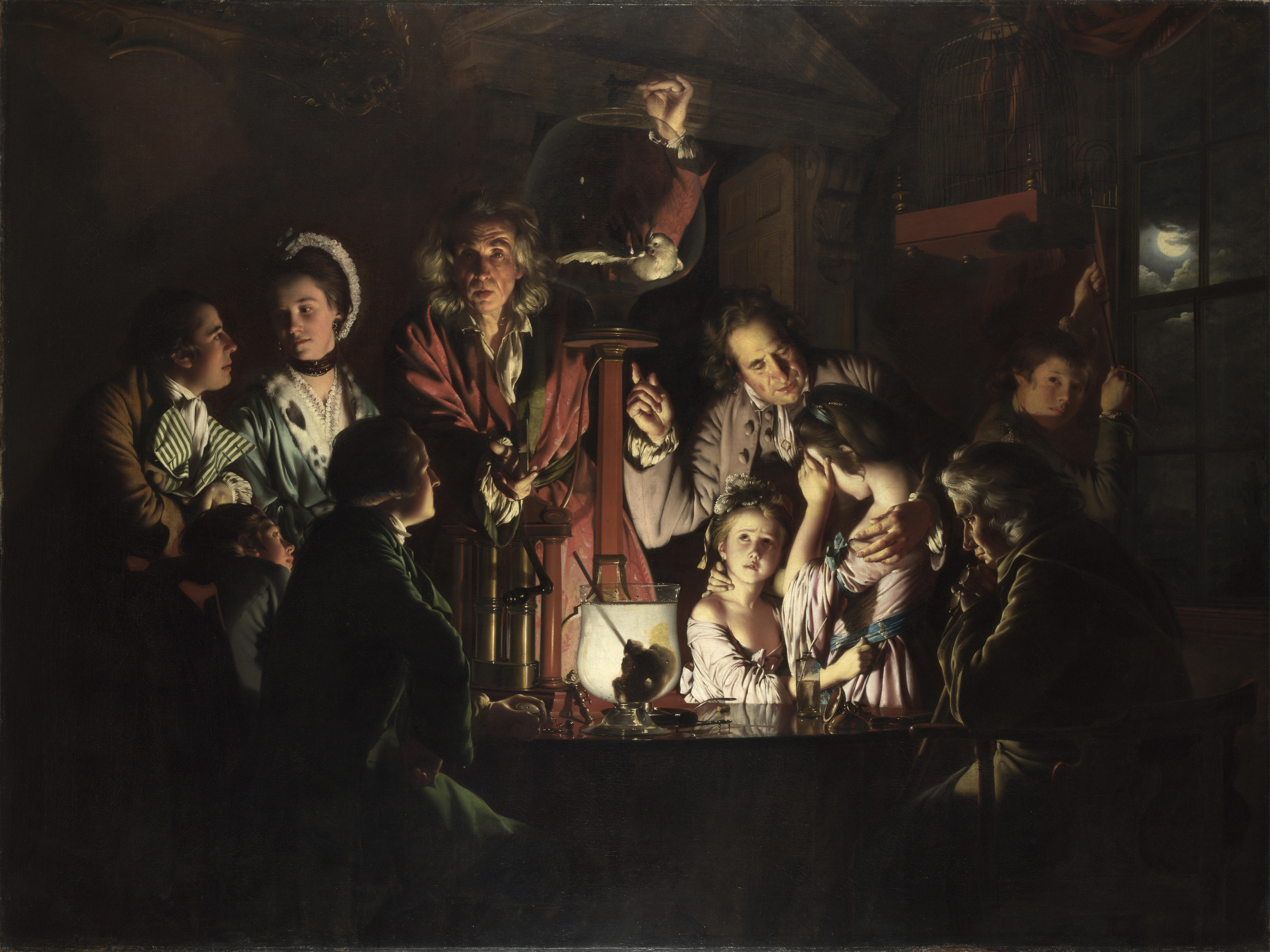
This painting, An Experiment on a Bird in the Air Pump by Joseph Wright of Derby, 1768, depicts an experiment performed by Robert Boyle in 1660.

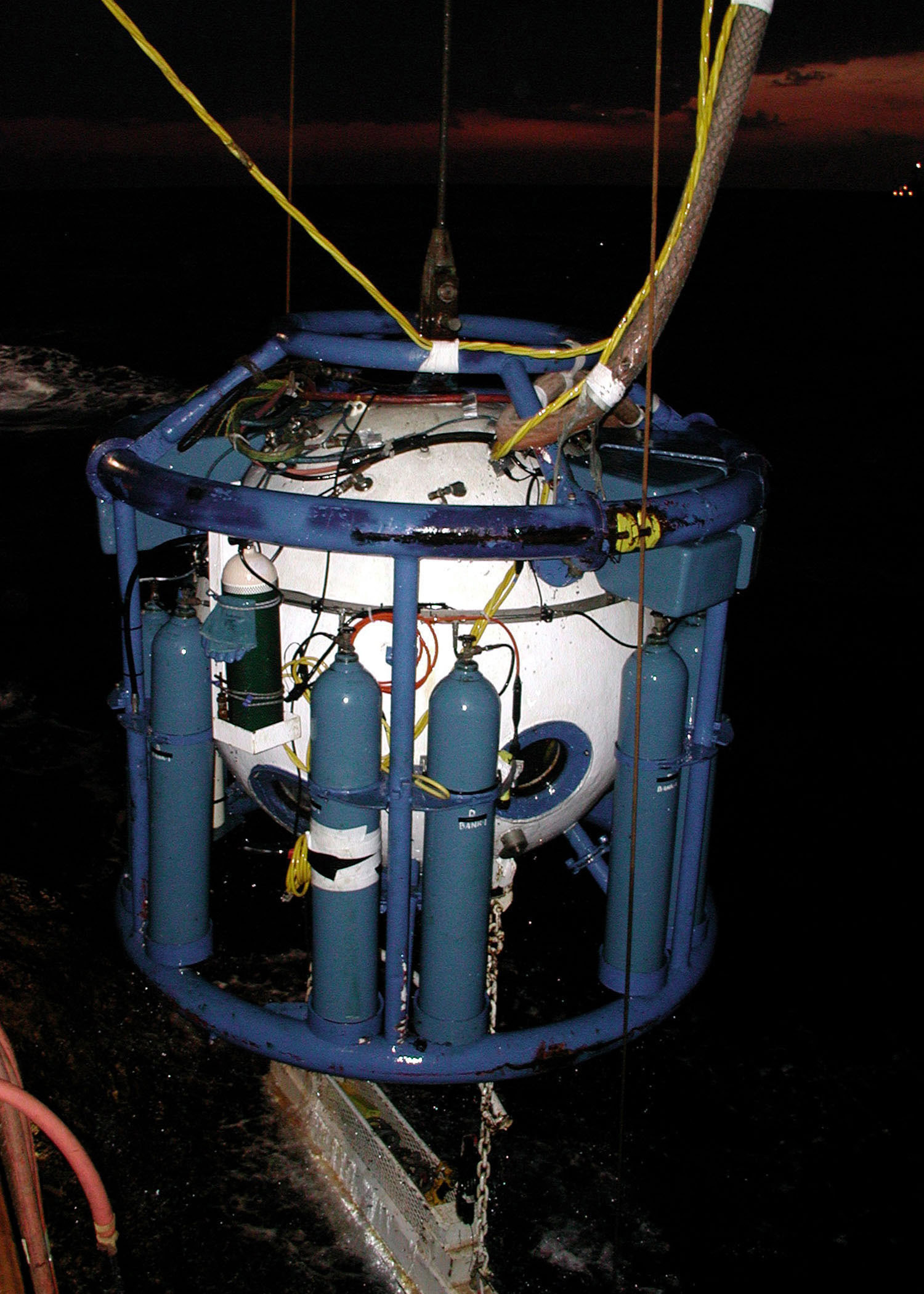
Dry bell

The symptoms of decompression sickness are caused by damage from the formation and growth of bubbles of inert gas within the tissues and by blockage of arterial blood supply to tissues by gas bubbles and other emboli consequential to bubble formation and tissue damage.

The precise mechanisms of bubble formation and the damage they cause has been the subject of medical research for a considerable time and several hypotheses have been advanced and tested. Tables and algorithms for predicting the outcome of decompression schedules for specified hyperbaric exposures have been proposed, tested, and used, and usually found to be of some use but not entirely reliable. Decompression remains a procedure with some risk, but this has been reduced and is generally considered acceptable for dives within the well-tested range of commercial, military and recreational diving.

=== Early developments ===
The first recorded experimental work related to decompression was conducted by Robert Boyle, who subjected experimental animals to reduced ambient pressure by use of a primitive vacuum pump. In the earliest experiments the subjects died from asphyxiation, but in later experiments signs of what was later to become known as decompression sickness were observed.

Later, when technological advances allowed the use of pressurisation of mines and caissons to exclude water ingress, miners were observed to present symptoms of what would become known as caisson disease, compressed air illness, the bends, and decompression sickness.

Once it was recognised that the symptoms were caused by gas bubbles, and that re-compression could relieve the symptoms, Paul Bert showed in 1878 that decompression sickness is caused by nitrogen bubbles released from tissues and blood during or after decompression, and showed the advantages of breathing oxygen after developing decompression sickness.

Further work showed that it was possible to avoid symptoms by slow decompression, and subsequently various theoretical models have been derived to predict safe decompression profiles and treatment of decompression sickness.

=== Start of systematic work on decompression models ===
In 1908 John Scott Haldane prepared the first recognized decompression table for the British Admiralty, based on extensive experiments on goats using an end point of symptomatic DCS.

George D. Stillson of the United States Navy tested and refined Haldane's tables in 1912, and this research led to the first publication of the United States Navy Diving Manual and the establishment of a Navy Diving School in Newport, Rhode Island. At about the same time Leonard Erskine Hill was working on a system of continuous uniform decompression

The Naval School, Diving and Salvage was re-established at the Washington Navy Yard in 1927, and the Navy Experimental Diving Unit (NEDU) was moved to the same venue. In the following years, the Experimental Diving Unit developed the US Navy Air Decompression Tables, which became the accepted world standard for diving with compressed air.

During the 1930s, Hawkins, Schilling and Hansen conducted extensive experimental dives to determine allowable supersaturation ratios for different tissue compartments for Haldanean model, Albert R. Behnke and others experimented with oxygen for re-compression therapy, and the US Navy 1937 tables were published.

In 1941, altitude decompression sickness was first treated with hyperbaric oxygen. and the revised US Navy Decompression Tables were published in 1956.

=== Beginnings of alternative models ===
In 1965 LeMessurier and Hills published A thermodynamic approach arising from a study on Torres Strait diving techniques, which suggests that decompression by conventional models forms bubbles that are then eliminated by re-dissolving at the decompression stops—which is slower than elimination while still in solution. This indicates the importance of minimizing bubble phase for efficient gas elimination, Groupe d'Etudes et Recherches Sous-marines published the French Navy MN65 decompression tables, and Goodman and Workman introduced re-compression tables using oxygen to accelerate elimination of inert gas.

The Royal Naval Physiological Laboratory published tables based on Hempleman's tissue slab diffusion model in 1972, isobaric counterdiffusion in subjects who breathed one inert gas mixture while being surrounded by another was first described by Graves, Idicula, Lambertsen, and Quinn in 1973, and the French government published the MT74 Tables du Ministère du Travail in 1974.

From 1976, decompression sickness testing sensitivity was improved by ultrasonic methods that can detect mobile venous bubbles before symptoms of DCS become apparent.

=== Development of several additional approaches ===
Paul K Weathersby, Louis D Homer and Edward T Flynn introduced survival analysis into the study of decompression sickness in 1982.

Albert A. Bühlmann published Decompression–Decompression sickness in 1984. Bühlmann recognised the problems associated with altitude diving, and proposed a method that calculated maximum nitrogen loading in the tissues at a particular ambient pressure by modifying Haldane's allowable supersaturation ratios to increase linearly with depth. In 1984 DCIEM (Defence and Civil Institution of Environmental Medicine, Canada) released No-Decompression and Decompression Tables based on the Kidd/Stubbs serial compartment model and extensive ultrasonic testing, and Edward D. Thalmann published the USN E-L algorithm and tables for constant PO_{2} Nitrox closed circuit rebreather applications, and extended use of the E-L model for constant PO_{2} Heliox CCR in 1985. The E-L model may be interpreted as a bubble model. The 1986 Swiss Sport Diving Tables were based on the Haldanean Bühlmann model, as were the 1987 SAA Bühlmann tables in the UK.

=== Bubble models started to become prevalent ===
D. E. Yount and D. C. Hoffman proposed a bubble model in 1986, and the BSAC'88 tables were based on Hennessy's bubble model.

The 1990 DCIEM sport diving tables were based on fitting experimental data, rather than a physiological model, and the 1990 French Navy Marine Nationale 90 (MN90) decompression tables were a development of the earlier Haldanean model of the MN65 tables.

In 1991 D.E. Yount described a development of his earlier bubble model, the Varied Permeability Model, and the 1992 French civilian Tables du Ministère du Travail (MT92) also have a bubble model interpretation.

NAUI published Trimix and Nitrox tables based on the Wienke reduced gradient bubble model (RGBM) in 1999, followed by recreational air tables based on the RGBM model in 2001.

NORSOK standard U-100 Table 12 published in 1999 describes saturation decompression for commercial diving:

In 2007, Wayne Gerth and David Doolette published VVal 18 and VVal 18M parameter sets for tables and programs based on the Thalmann E-L algorithm, and produced an internally compatible set of decompression tables for open circuit and CCR on air and Nitrox, including in water air/oxygen decompression and surface decompression on oxygen. In 2008, the US Navy Diving Manual Revision 6 included a version of the 2007 tables developed by Gerth and Doolette.

In 2016 the US Navy Diving Manual Revision 7 was published, which incorporated a new version of the air decompression tables based on the exponential/linear VVAL-79 model after extensive evaluation using probabilistic models to amend profiles known to have above average DCS risk.

== See also ==
- Decompression practice – Techniques and procedures for safe decompression of divers
- Decompression sickness – Disorder caused by dissolved gases forming bubbles in tissues
- Decompression theory – Theoretical modelling of decompression physiology
- Equivalent air depth – Method of comparing decompression requirements for air and a given nitrox mix
- Equivalent narcotic depth – Method for comparing the narcotic effects of a mixed diving gas with air
- History of decompression research and development
- Hyperbaric treatment schedules – Planned hyperbaric exposure using a specified breathing gas as medical treatment
- Oxygen window – Difference between the partial pressures of oxygen in arterial blood and body tissues
- Physiology of decompression – Physiological basis for decompression theory and practice
- Decompression models:
  - Bühlmann decompression algorithm – Mathematical model of tissue inert gas uptake and release with pressure change
  - Haldane's decompression model – Decompression model developed by John Scott Haldane
  - Reduced gradient bubble model – Decompression algorithm
  - Thalmann algorithm – Mathematical model for diver decompression
  - Thermodynamic model of decompression – Early diving decompression model
  - Varying Permeability Model – Decompression model and algorithm based on bubble physics
