= Albert A. Bühlmann =

Swiss physician and decompression researcher (1923–1994)

Albert A Bühlmann
- Born: 16 May 1923
- Died: 4 March 1994 (aged 70)
- Education: University of Zürich
- Known for: Describing and developing a decompression algorithm used throughout the world to reduce the risk of decompression sickness.
- Scientific career
- Fields: Diving medicine, physiology
- Workplaces: University of Zürich

Albert Alois Bühlmann (16 May 1923 – 16 March 1994) was a Swiss physician who was principally responsible for a number of important contributions to decompression science at the Laboratory of Hyperbaric Physiology at the University Hospital in Zürich, Switzerland. His impact on diving ranged from complex commercial and military diving to the occasional recreational diver. He is held in high regard for his professional ethics and attention to his research subjects.

== Background ==
After completing his education at the University of Zürich, Bühlmann specialized in pathophysiology of the respiratory and circulatory systems. He was particularly interested in respiratory physiology at high altitudes and high pressure environments.

== Bühlmann decompression algorithm ==
The Bühlmann decompression algorithm is used to create decompression tables.

In 1959, Hannes Keller became interested in deep diving and developed tables for mixed-gas decompression. Not a diver himself, Bühlmann was intrigued by project and suggested suitable breathing gases. Keller successfully tested his idea in the Lake Zurich where he reached a depth of 400 feet and then Lake Maggiore where he reached a depth of 728 feet.

Building on the previous work of John Scott Haldane and Robert Workman, and with funding from Shell Oil Company, Bühlmann designed studies to establish the longest half-times of nitrogen and helium. These studies were confirmed by the Capshell experiments in the Mediterranean Sea in 1966.

The naming convention he used to describe his algorithms, for example, ZH-L16, comes from Zürich (ZH), limits (L) and the number of tissue compartments or M-value sets used (16).

In 1962, Keller set a new world record when he reached a depth of 1000 feet off the coast of California utilizing Bühlmann's algorithm in a study funded by the United States Navy.

Two out of eight Swiss military divers suffered decompression sickness following dives 1800 meters above sea level in Lake Silvaplana. Bühlmann recognized the problems associated with altitude diving, and proposed a method which calculated maximum nitrogen loading in the tissues at a particular ambient pressure. The tables developed were adopted by the Swiss military in 1972. An expedition to Lake Titicaca at 3800 meters above sea level in 1987 revealed no decompression issues while utilizing Bühlmann's ZH-L16 algorithm. In addition to altitude diving, his calculations also include considerations for repetitive dive profiles.

The results of Bühlmann's research that began in 1959, was published in a 1983 German book entitled Dekompression-Dekompressionskrankheit (Decompression-Decompression Sickness). An English version of this book became available in 1984. The book was regarded as the most complete public reference on decompression calculations and was used soon after in coding dive computer algorithms. Two follow-up books were published in 1992 and 1995.

Versions of Bühlmann's ZHL-16 model have been used to generate the standard diving tables for a number of sports diving associations. Max Hahn used Bühlmann's model to develop the Deco '92 Tables used by the Swiss Underwater Sport Association and the Association of German Sports Divers, and Bob Cole and Bühlmann developed the Sub-Aqua Association (SAA) Bühlmann System in 1987, which used the tables and a set of instructions for their use in recreational diving without decompression stops. The tables are still used in the 2020s and remain popular, while many dive computers use variations of the ZHL-8, ZH-L12, or ZHL-16 algorithm.

== Death ==
Bühlmann died unexpectedly of heart failure on 16 March 1994.

== Awards ==
The Undersea and Hyperbaric Medical Society gave Bühlmann the Oceaneering award in 1977.

In 1993, the Divers Alert Network presented Bühlmann with an award for his life's work in the service of decompression science.

== See also ==
- Decompression theory – Theoretical modelling of decompression physiology
- Bühlmann decompression algorithm – Mathematical model of tissue inert gas uptake and release with pressure change
- Dive computer – Instrument to calculate decompression status in real time
