= Hannes Keller =

Swiss mathematician, physicist and diver (1934–2022)

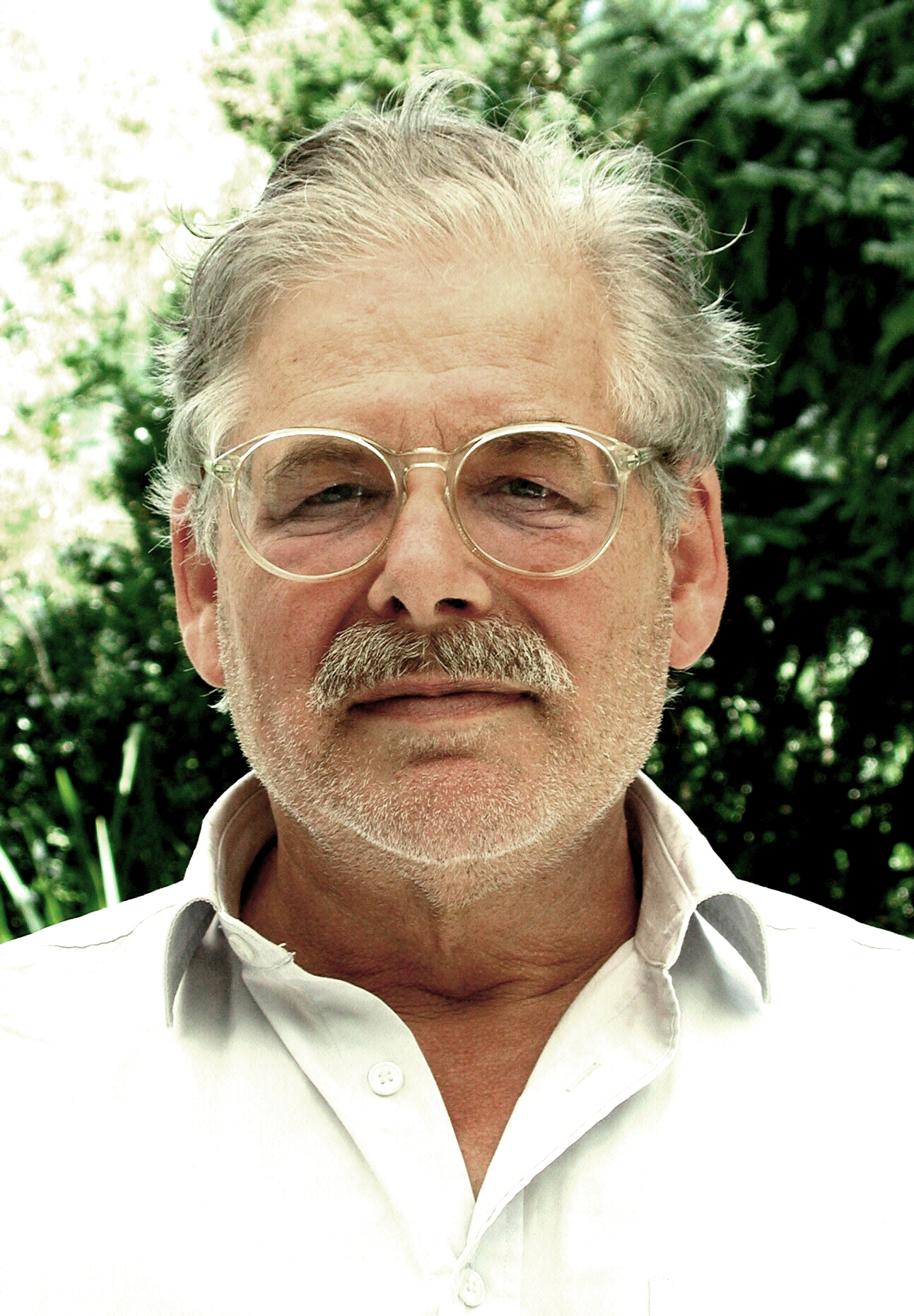
Hannes Keller

Hannes Keller (20 September 1934 – 1 December 2022 (aged 88)) was a Swiss physicist, mathematician, deep diving pioneer, and entrepreneur. In 1962, he reached a depth of 1,000 feet (300 m) in open ocean. In the 1970s through the 1980s, Keller made himself a name as an entrepreneur in the IT industry. Keller was also an amateur classical pianist who produced two CDs and occasionally performed for audiences of up to 2000 people.

== Deep diving ==
Keller donning diving dress at the United States Navy Experimental Diving Unit

Keller was born in Winterthur, Switzerland. He studied philosophy, mathematics, and theoretical physics at the University of Zurich. He became interested in deep diving and developed tables for mixed-gas decompression, supported by Albert A. Bühlmann who suggested suitable gases. Keller successfully tested his idea in Lake Zurich, where he reached a depth of 400 feet (120 m), and Lake Maggiore, where he reached a depth of 728 feet (222 m). On 3 December 1962, he set a new world record when he reached a depth of 1,000 feet (300 m) off the coast of Santa Catalina Island, California, together with Peter Small. This major achievement was overshadowed by the tragic end of the mission: Keller was lucky to survive while Peter Small and Chris Whittaker, a young UCLA student and supporting diver, lost their lives.

In the following years, navies and hospitals bought decompression chambers constructed by Keller.

== Career after diving ==
In the 1970s, Keller sold his own line of computers and in the 1980s became a leading vendor of IBM PCs in Switzerland. He developed a series of software products (Witchpen, Ways for Windows, and Wizardmaker) which provided automatic spell checking, literal machine translation, and macro recording.

Keller used to run Visipix the largest fine art and photo museum online with 1.3 million exhibits, all with free copyrights for any use.

After 2005, Keller was a full-time artist.

In 2009, Keller joined the advisory board for the United States Historical Diving Society.

Keller died on 1 December 2022 in Niederglatt, Switzerland, at the age of 88.
