= Modes of underwater diving =

Techniques requiring specific equipment and procedures

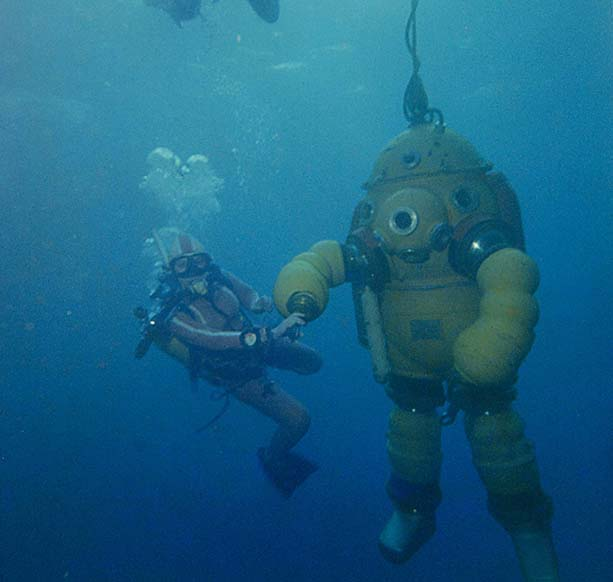
Two very different modes of diving: Ambient pressure open circuit scuba diving (left) and atmospheric pressure diving in a pressure resistant suit (right)

A mode of diving, or diving mode, is a particular way to dive underwater that requires specific equipment, procedures and techniques, and may expose the diver to a particular range of hazards.

There are several modes of diving; these are distinguished by the type of breathing apparatus, diving equipment, procedures and techniques involved, and whether the diver is exposed to ambient pressure. Ambient pressure diving includes freediving and compressed-gas diving, which may also be classed as air diving, oxygen diving, and mixed gas diving by the breathing gas used, and as open-circuit, semi-closed, or closed-circuit depending on the type of breathing apparatus used. There is also atmospheric pressure diving, which involves encapsulation in an atmospheric pressure diving suit or submersible, and unmanned diving, where there are no human divers involved. The diving equipment, support equipment and procedures used largely depend on the mode of diving.

In certain circumstances, some modes of diving may be impracticable, unsafe, not permitted by the governing organisation, or illegal. All modes of diving carry a certain amount of risk; this is mitigated with planning, training, and the appropriate equipment.

== Ambient pressure diving ==
Ambient pressure diving modes are those in which the diver is exposed to the ambient pressure in the water due to combined hydrostatic and local atmospheric pressure.

Ambient pressure diving can also be classified as surface-oriented diving, where the diver is decompressed to surface ambient pressure at the end of each dive, and saturation diving, where the diver remains under pressure between in-water exposures. There is also a distinction between freediving, where the diver holds their breath, and compressed-gas diving, where the diver breathes gas at ambient pressure during the dive.

They may be further classified by the type of breathing apparatus used, and by the level of confinement of the diving environment.

=== Surface-oriented (bounce) diving ===
Professional divers refer to diving where the diver starts and finishes the diving operation at atmospheric pressure as surface-oriented, or bounce diving. In recreational diving there is no need to make this distinction, as all recreational diving is surface-oriented, usually without decompression stops.The diver may be deployed from the shore or a diving support vessel and may be transported on a diving stage or in a diving bell. Surface-supplied divers almost always wear diving helmets or full-face diving masks. The bottom gas can be air, nitrox, heliox or trimix; the decompression gases may be similar, or may include pure oxygen. Decompression procedures include in-water decompression or surface decompression in a deck chamber. Surface oriented dives may use a transportation platform to move the diver vertically through the water column, may be assisted by an attendant controlling the umbilical, or the diver may control their own descent and ascent.

==== Freediving ====
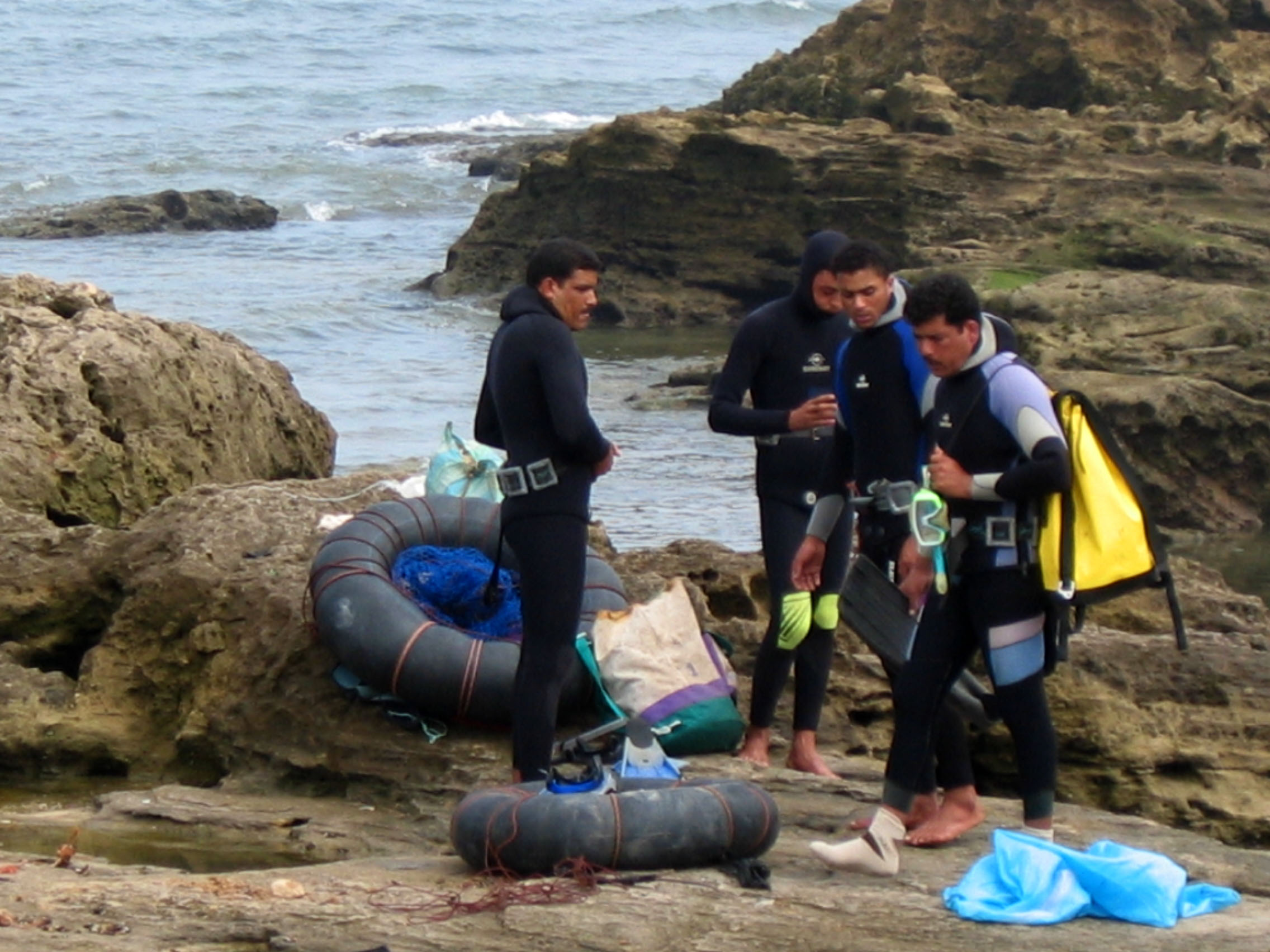
Recreational breath-hold divers in basic equipment with floats and catch bags suitable for collecting lobster or shellfish

The ability to dive and swim underwater while holding one's breath is considered a useful emergency skill, an important part of water sport and navy safety training, and an enjoyable leisure activity. It is the original diving mode. Underwater diving without breathing apparatus can be categorised as underwater swimming, snorkelling and freediving; these categories overlap considerably. Several competitive underwater sports are practised without breathing apparatus.

Freediving excludes the use of underwater breathing apparatus, and relies on the ability of divers to hold their breath until resurfacing. The technique ranges from simple breath-hold diving to competitive apnea dives. Swimfins and a diving mask are often used in free diving to provide more efficient propulsion and improve underwater vision. A short breathing tube called a snorkel allows the diver to breathe at the surface while the face is immersed.

==== Scuba diving ====
Scuba diving in open circuit and rebreather modes

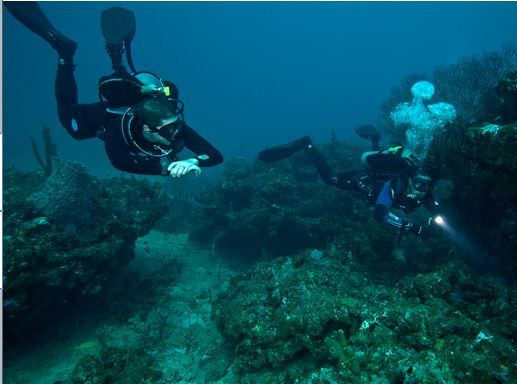
Recreational scuba divers on open circuit

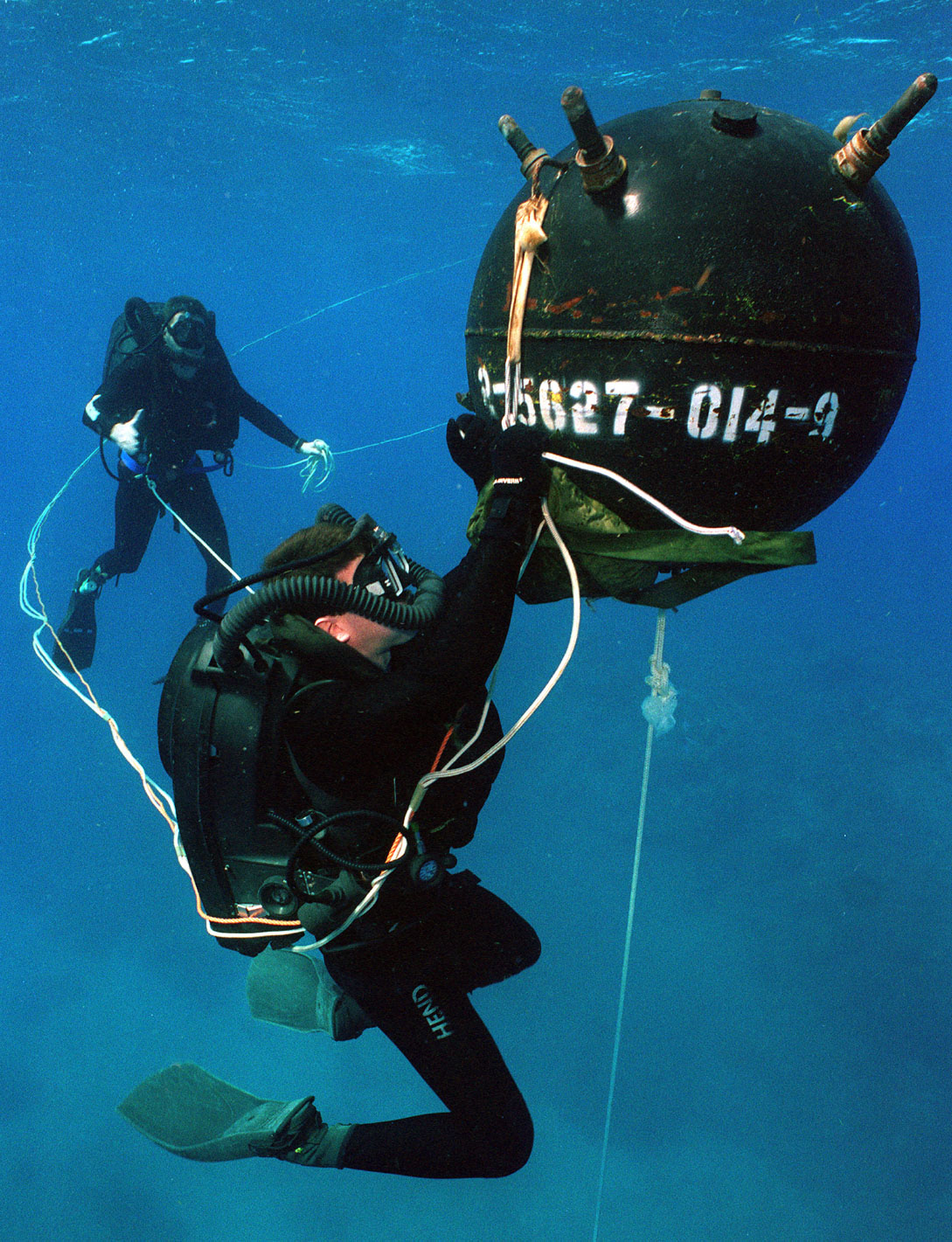
Explosive ordnance disposal divers using rebreathers

Scuba diving is a mode of compressed-gas diving with a self-contained underwater breathing apparatus, which is completely independent of surface supply. Scuba gives the diver mobility and horizontal range far beyond the reach of an umbilical hose attached to surface-supplied diving equipment (SSDE), and much greater endurance than freediving.

===== Open circuit scuba =====
Open circuit scuba systems discharge breathing gas into the environment as it is exhaled, and consist of one or more diving cylinders containing pressurized breathing gas, supplied to the diver at ambient pressure through a diving regulator. They may include additional cylinders for decompression gas or emergency breathing gas.

===== Scuba rebreather =====
Closed-circuit or semi-closed circuit rebreather scuba systems allow the recycling of exhaled gases; the volume of gas used is reduced compared to that of open circuit, so smaller cylinders may be used for an equivalent dive duration. They allow a diver to spend much more time underwater while consuming the same amount of gas. Rebreathers produce fewer bubbles and less noise than scuba, which makes them attractive to covert military divers to avoid detection, to scientific divers to avoid disturbing marine animals, and to media divers to avoid bubble interference.

==== Surface-supplied diving ====
Surface-supplied diving in surface-oriented and saturation modes

Surface-oriented diver entering the water

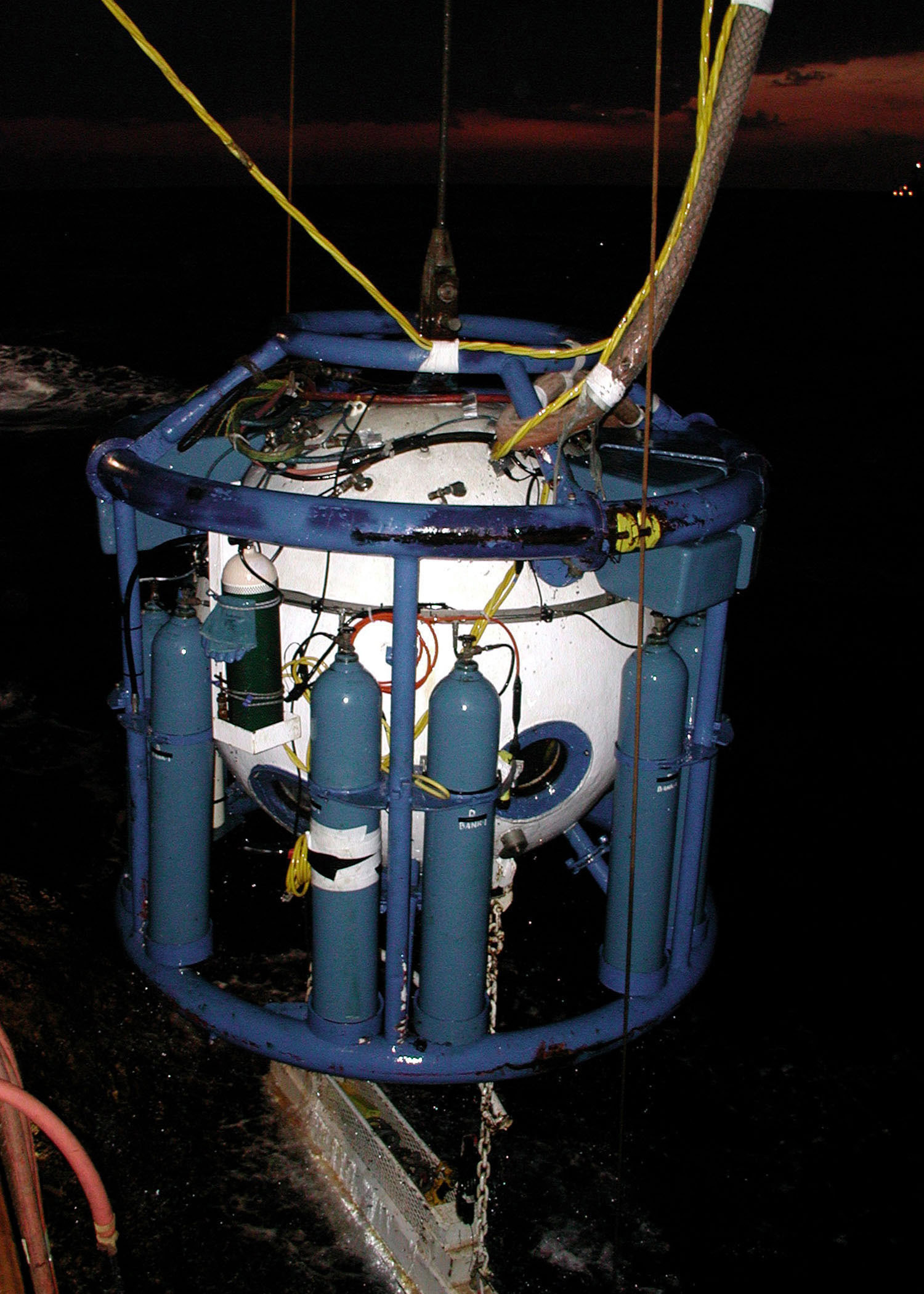
Closed diving bell, also known as a diver transfer capsule

An alternative to self-contained breathing systems is to supply breathing gases from the surface through a hose. When combined with a communication cable, a pneumofathometer hose and a safety line it is called the diver's umbilical, which may also include a hot water hose for heating, video cable and breathing gas reclaim line. The diver generally wears a full-face mask or helmet, and gas may be supplied either on demand or at a constant, continuous rate. More basic equipment that uses only an air hose is called an airline or hookah system. This allows the diver to breathe using an air supply hose from high pressure cylinders or a diving air compressor at the surface. Breathing gas is supplied through a mouth-held demand valve or light full-face mask. Airline diving is used for work such as hull cleaning and archaeological surveys, for shellfish harvesting, and as snuba, a shallow water activity typically practised by tourists and those who are not scuba-certified.

===== Stage diving =====
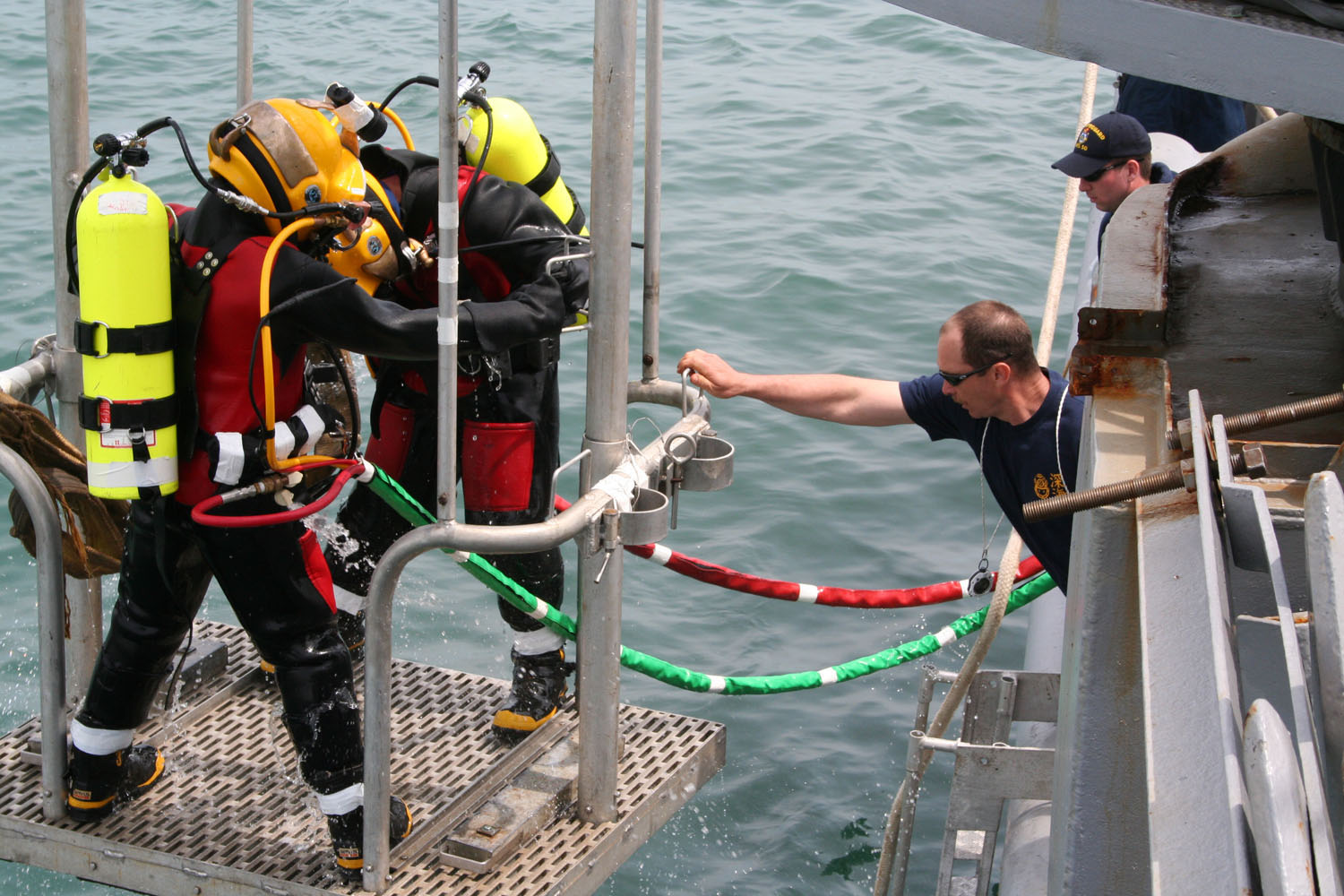
Diving stage

Stage diving may refer to surface-supplied diving from a diving stage, or technical scuba diving where stage cylinders are used for different stages of a long dive, and may contain different gases. A diving stage or diving basket is a simple platform lowered and lifted from the surface platform by a winch under the control of the diving team. The diver's umbilical leads directly to the diver and is managed at the surface by the diver's attendant. In-water decompression is facilitated as the stage can be hoisted at a controlled rate and held at reasonably constant depths for stops.

===== Open bell diving =====
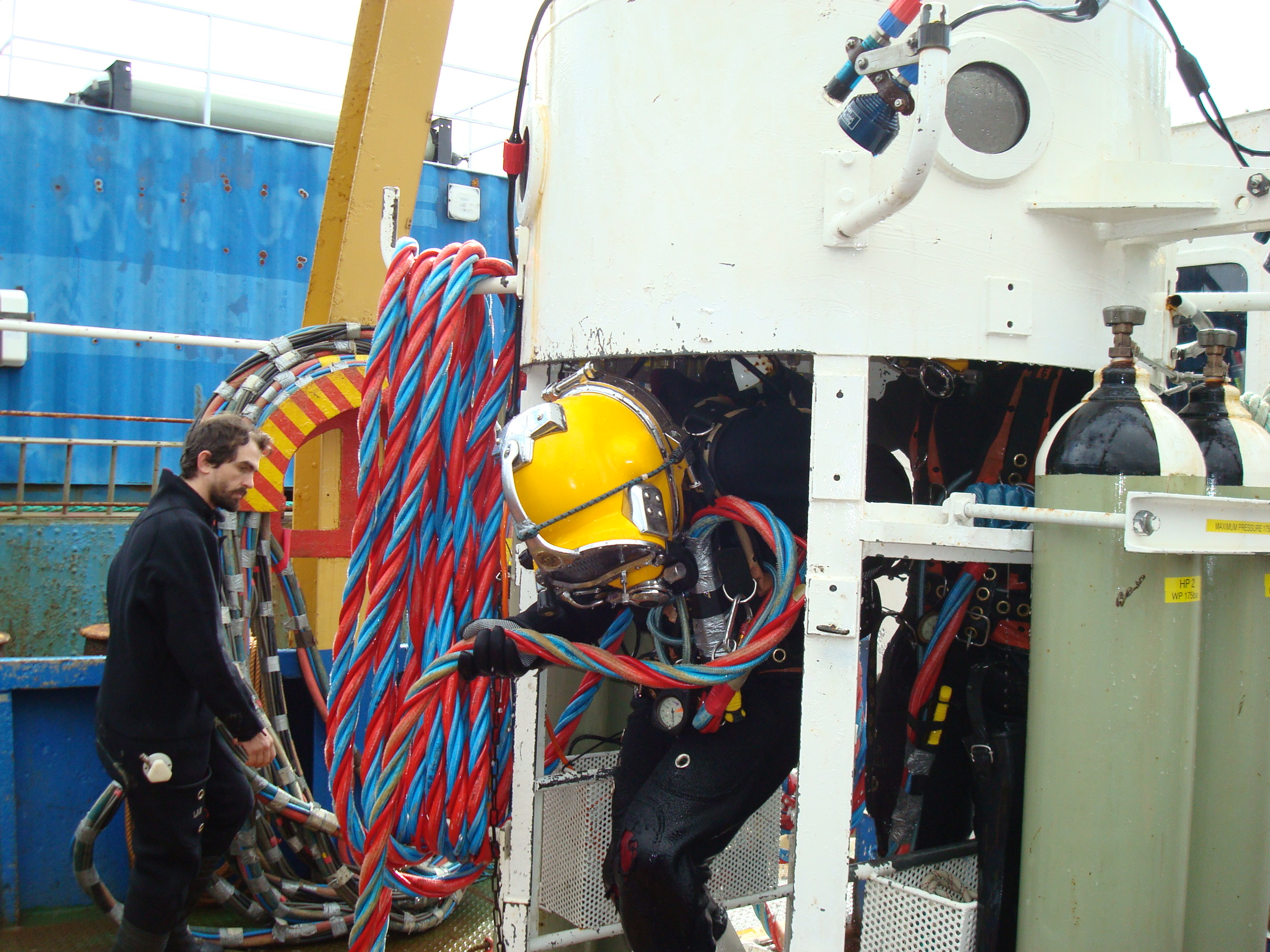
Diver under a wet bell at the surface site

Open bell diving uses an ambient pressure diving bell to transport the diver through the water column. A wet bell with a gas filled dome provides more comfort and control than a stage and allows for longer time in water. Wet bells can be used for air and mixed gas diving, and divers can decompress on oxygen at 12 metres (40 ft).

===== Closed bell bounce diving =====
Small closed bell systems have been designed that can be easily mobilised, and include a two-man bell, a launch and recovery system and a chamber for decompression after transfer under pressure (TUP). Divers can breathe air or mixed gas at the bottom and are usually recovered with the chamber filled with air. They decompress on oxygen supplied through built in breathing systems (BIBS) towards the end of the decompression. Small bell systems support bounce diving down to 120 metres (390 ft) and for bottom times up to 2 hours. Larger closed bells can be used the same way and also for saturation diving with up to three divers, including a bellman.

===== Scuba replacement =====
A relatively portable surface gas supply system using high pressure gas cylinders for both primary and reserve gas, but using the full diver's umbilical system with pneumofathometer and voice communication, is known in the industry as "scuba replacement". It is generally used where scuba equipment cannot be used for reasons of safety or when it is not allowed by regulations or code of practice, and full surface supplied equipment is inconvenient, impractical, or unsafe. A lightweight helmet or full-face mask and bailout cylinder are standard for this mode

===== Air-line diving =====
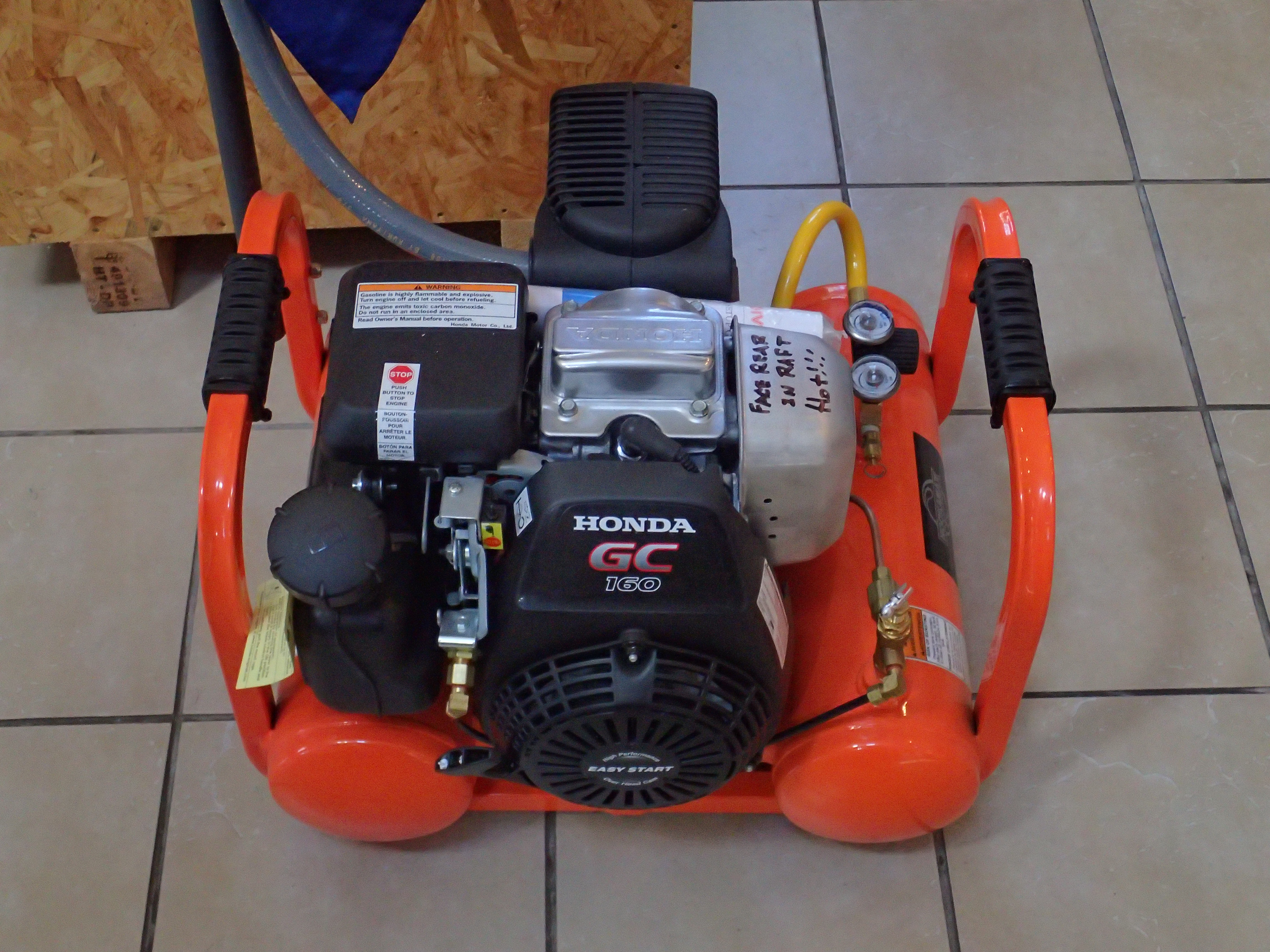
Low pressure breathing air compressor intended for air-line diving

Hookah, Sasuba and Snuba systems are categorised as "air-line" equipment, as they are supplied through a basic air line, and do not include the communication, lifeline and pneumofathometer hose characteristic of a full diver's umbilical. A bailout system is not an inherent part of an air-line diving system, though it may be required in some applications.

Their field of application is very different from full surface-supplied diving. Hookah is generally used for shallow water work in low-hazard applications, and sometimes for open water hunting and gathering of seafood, shallow water mining of gold and diamonds in rivers and streams, and bottom cleaning and other underwater maintenance of boats, hull cleaning, swimming pool maintenance, and shallow underwater inspections.

Sasuba and Snuba are a shallow water recreational application for low-hazard sites, using air supplied through a short hose of about 7 m to a demand valve mouthpiece.

===== Compressor diving =====
Compressor diving is a rudimentary method of surface-supplied diving used in some tropical regions such as the Philippines and the Caribbean. The divers swim with a half mask and fins and are supplied with air from an industrial low-pressure air compressor on the boat through plastic tubes. There is no reduction valve; the divers hold the hose ends in their mouths with no demand valve or mouthpiece and allow excess air to spill out between the lips.

=== Saturation diving ===
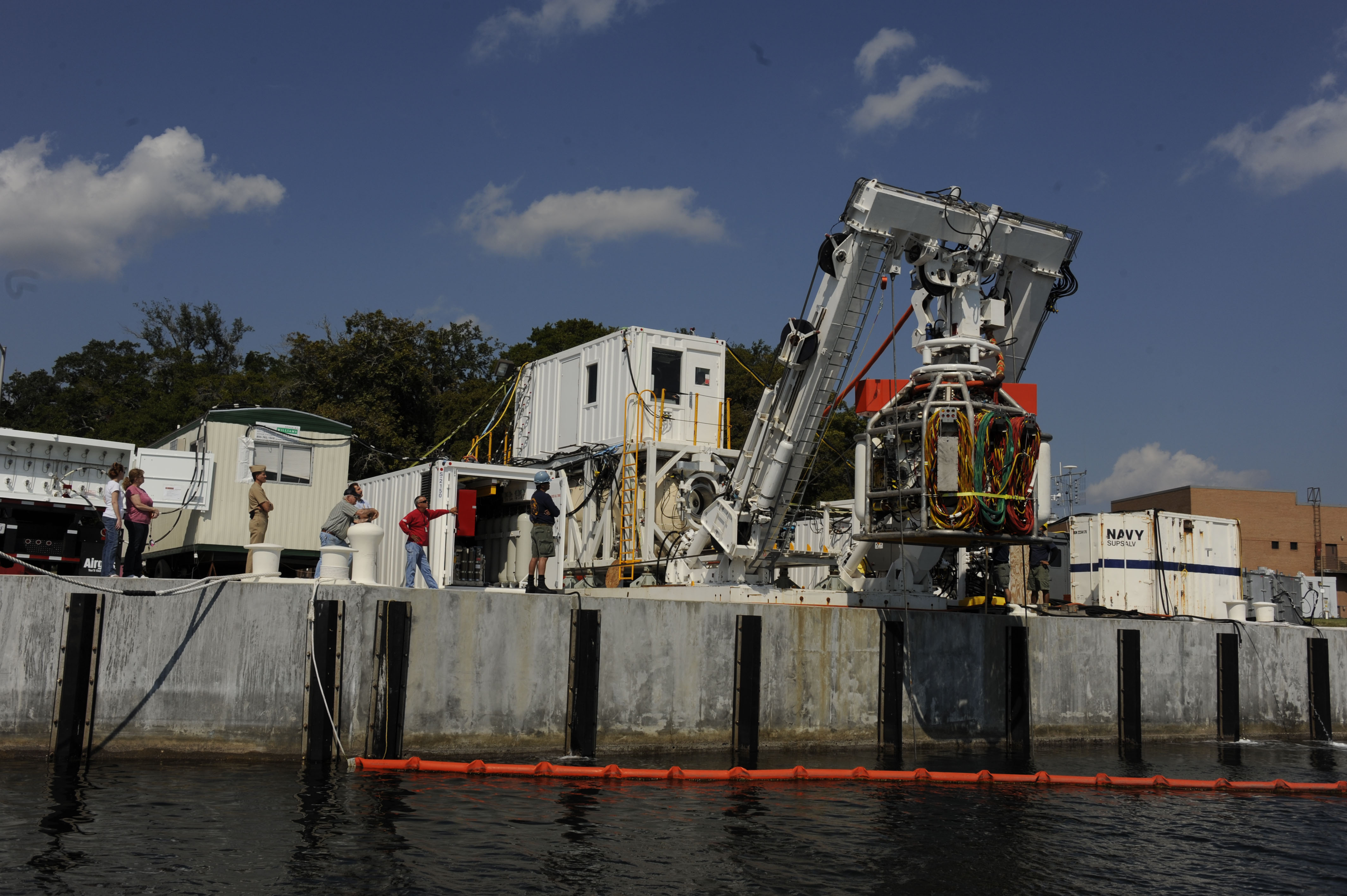
US Navy modular saturation system during manned testing

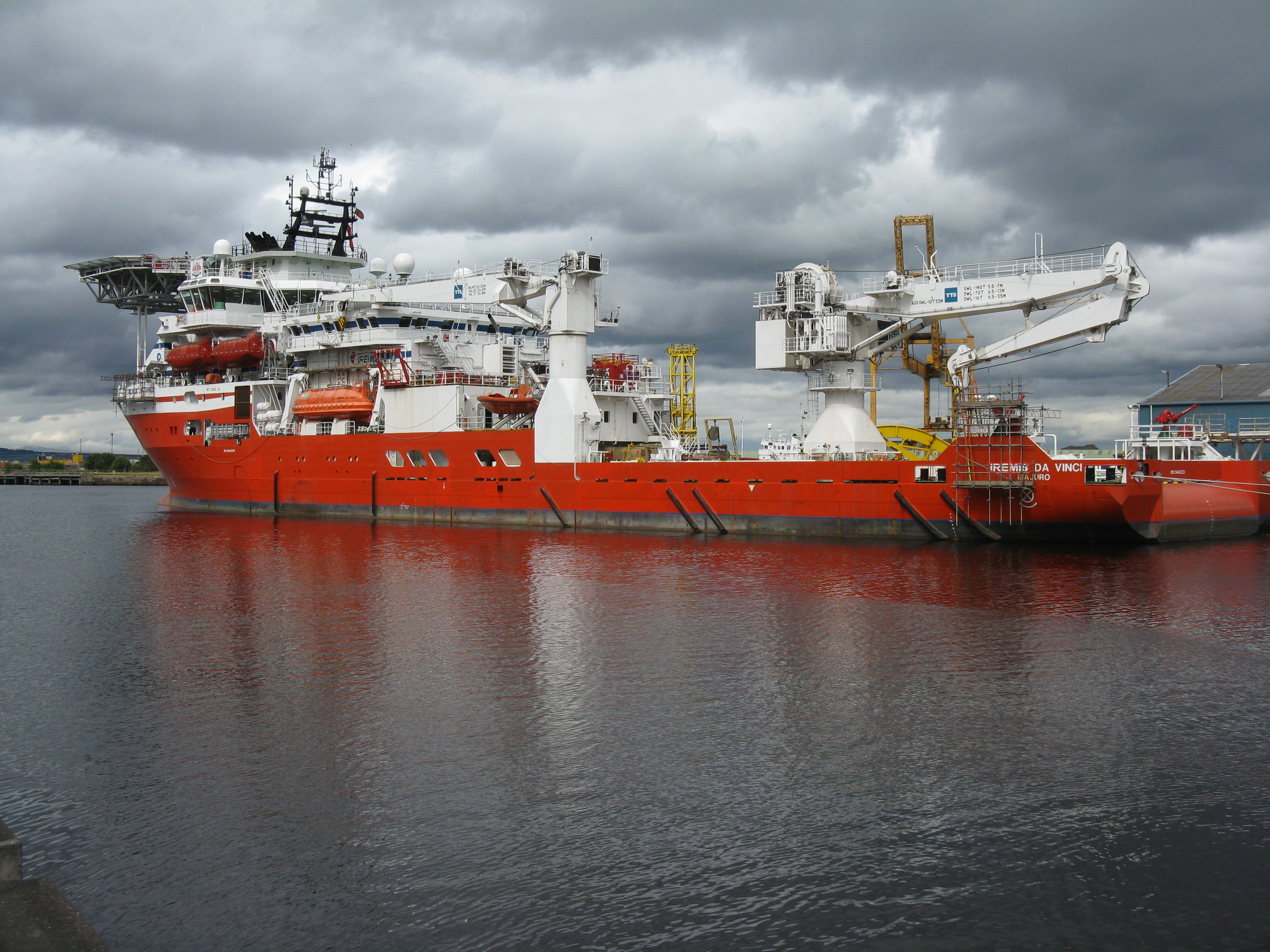
Saturation diving support vessel Iremis da Vinci.

Saturation diving lets professional divers live and work under pressure for days or weeks at a time. After working in the water, the divers rest and live in a dry pressurised underwater habitat on the bottom or a saturation life support system of pressure chambers at the surface, usually on the deck of a diving support vessel, oil platform or other floating platform, at a similar pressure to the ambient pressure at the work depth. They are transferred between surface accommodation and the underwater workplace in a pressurised closed diving bell. Decompression at the end of the dive may take many days, but since it is done only once for a long period of exposure, rather than after each of many shorter exposures, the overall risk of decompression injury to the diver and the total time spent decompressing are reduced. This type of diving allows greater work efficiency and safety.

=== Modes of breathing gas management ===
There are three basic modes of breathing gas management available for use in both self-contained (scuba) and surface-supplied underwater breathing apparatus for ambient pressure diving.

==== Open-circuit ====
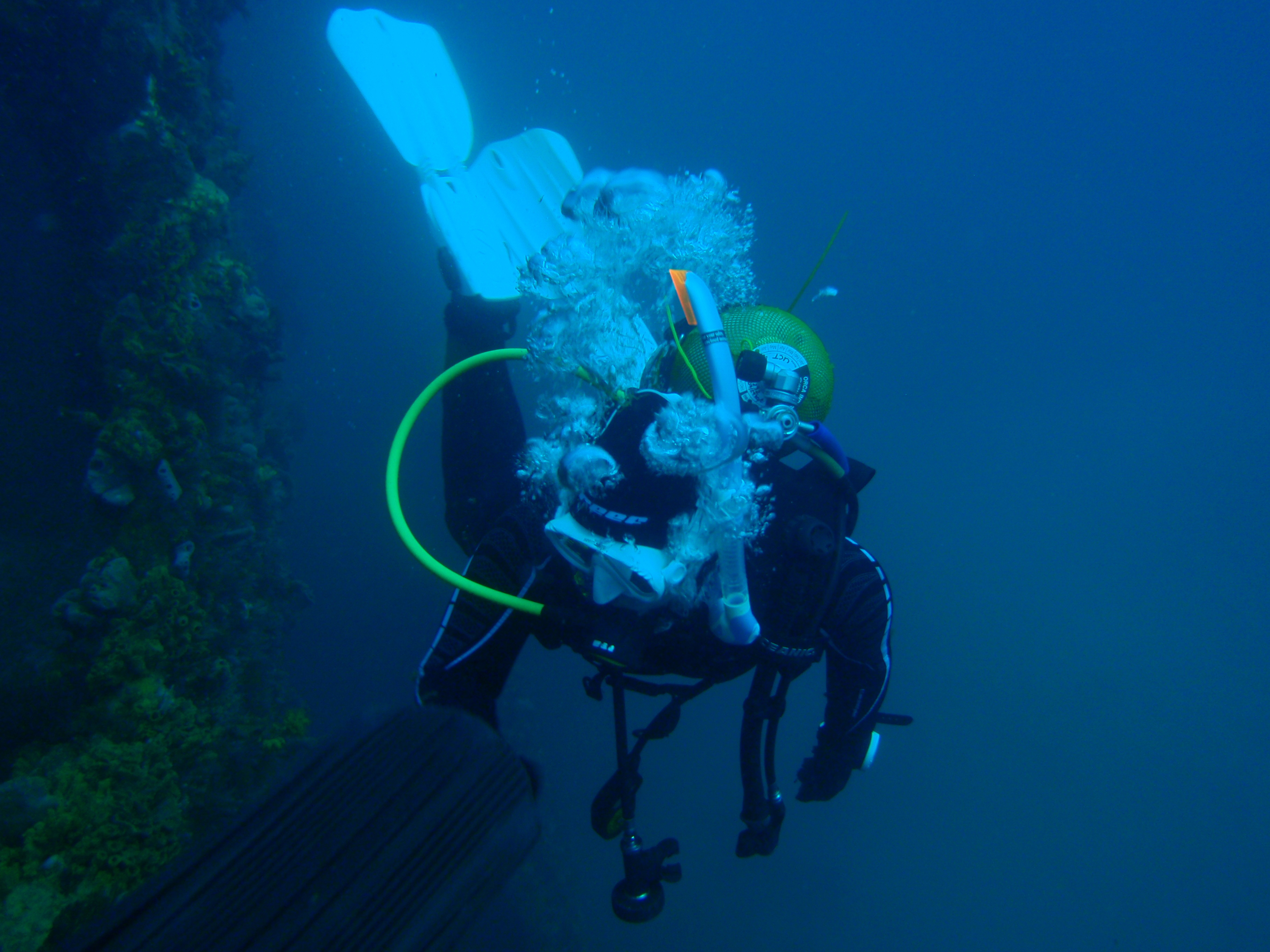
Diving with a recreational open-circuit scuba set

Open circuit diving uses breathing apparatus which discharges exhaled breathing gas directly into the environment. The simplest case of this system is constant oxygen fraction or constant gas fraction diving, when the same breathing gas mixture is used throughout the dive. However, open circuit can also be used with gas switching, where the breathing gases used on different stages of the dive are changed to better suit the depth and decompression requirements. Air diving is the classic example of single gas open circuit diving, but most recreational diving and shallow surface-supplied diving falls under this mode. Open circuit systems may provide gas by constant flow or supply on demand, and some equipment can be switched between these modes by the diver.

==== Closed-circuit ====
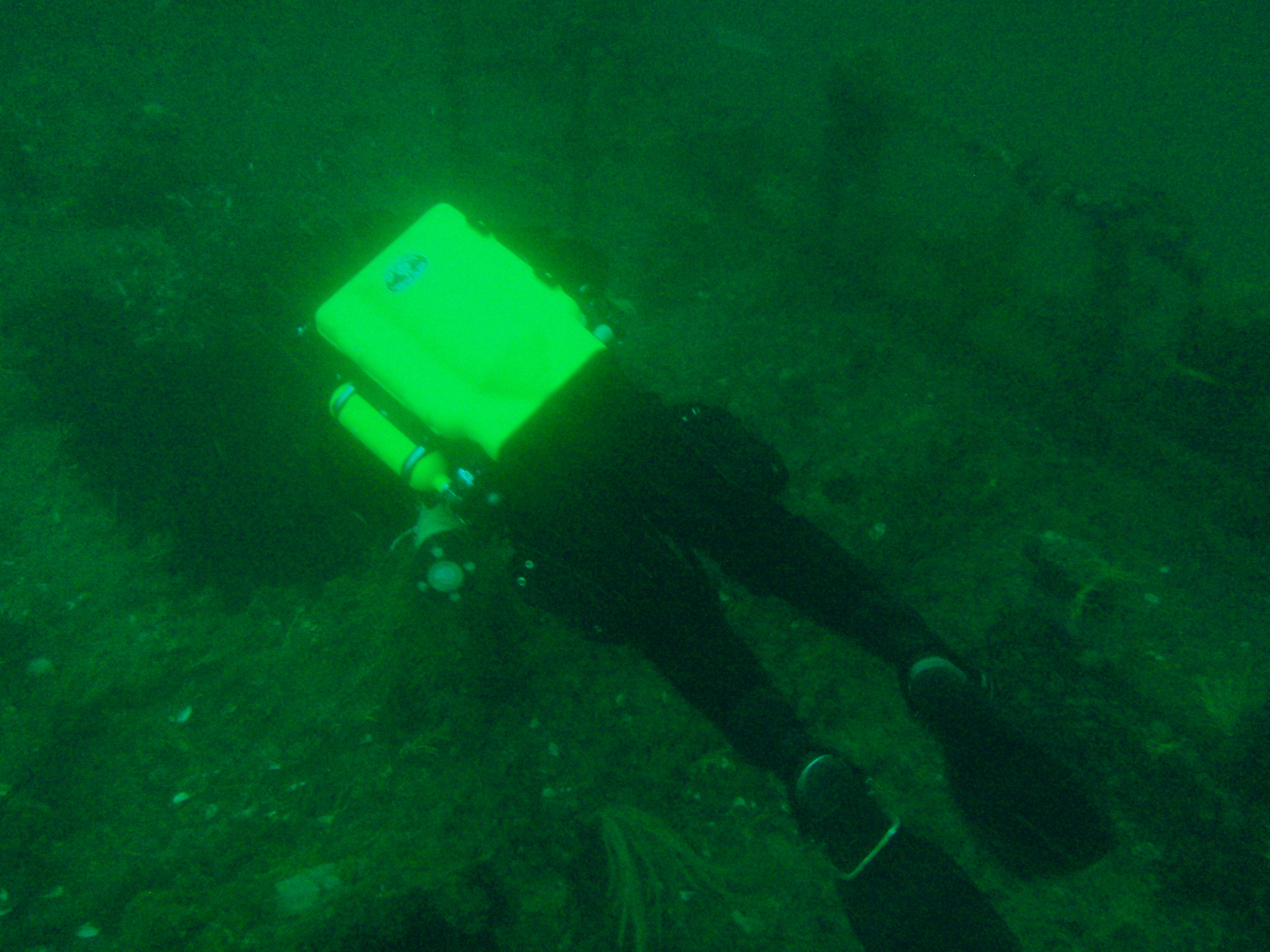
Diver using closed circuit rebreather

A closed-circuit apparatus recirculates breathing gas indefinitely, with carbon dioxide removed and oxygen added, generally to maintain a constant partial pressure, regardless of depth. This is also called constant oxygen partial pressure diving and is a feature of electronically controlled closed circuit rebreathers (eCCR) Gas reclaim systems and push-pull diving systems are forms of closed circuit gas recycling equipment not carried by the diver, used mainly to recover expensive helium-based diluent gases.

==== Semi-closed-circuit ====
A semi-closed-circuit apparatus partly recycles the breathing gas mixture. Oxygen partial pressure is maintained at a breathable level by addition of breathing gas mixture at a rate sufficient to make up the losses due to exhaust gas and metabolism. The oxygen concentration is not constant, but varies between predictable limits. The equipment used for this may be called a semi-closed circuit rebreather or a gas extender. Such systems have been used in scuba rebreathers, and surface supplied and self-contained free-flow helmet equipment.

=== Mode by breathing gas ===
The original breathing gas for diving was atmospheric air, and compressed air remains an important breathing gas for ambient pressure diving. Oxygen is limited to shallow water to avoid toxicity problems, and is usually used to accelerate decompression, or in closed circuit rebreathers by tactical divers to provide a long endurance with a small amount of gas, and to minimise bubbles where detection would be a tactical problem. Some physiological problems of deeper diving, such as inert gas narcosis and high work of breathing, can be mitigated by the use of breathing gases based on helium, and experimental work which includes hydrogen in the mixture for extreme depths, continues. The common terminology refers to air diving and gas diving, which includes oxygen diving, and mixed gas diving, which includes nitrox diving, trimix diving, and heliox diving.

Air is available for the cost of operating the compressor, so it is supplied on open circuit, and discharged into the surroundings on exhalation, and may be supplied through a free-flow system where this has advantages. Oxygen and nitrox are also cheap enough that it is usually economical to supply by demand open circuit except for long duration scuba operations, but helium is expensive and sometimes in short supply, so recycling can be viable for moderate usage, and essential for high volume usage. The costs of recycling by rebreathing or reclaiming helium based gases include high capital investment in the equipment, and additional running costs compared to open circuit. The use of hydrogen as a breathing gas component is still experimental.

=== Modes of decompression ===
Decompression is a part of every ambient pressure dive. Modes of decompression range from "no-stop dives" where a limited and controlled ascent rate is sufficient decompression, to decompression from saturation over several days.

Decompression can be continuous, where no stops are required, and the rate of ascent is limited to provide sufficient time to outgas safely, or staged, where ascent is made up to and between stops a limited rate, but most of the outgassing occurs during periods of constant depth, (pressure) called decompression stops. Continuous decompression rates depend on the theoretical gas loading of the controlling tissue, and may be fixed or, more often, variable with depth.

Decompression can also be done entirely in the water, partly in the water and partly in a surface decompression chamber or entirely in one or more decompression chambers. It can also be classified by the type of breathing gases used while decompressing, whether there are changes in gas composition during decompression, and whether the changes are stepwise or continuous, or a combination of both.

Air diving traditionally uses air as breathing gas for the entire dive, including for in-water staged decompression. It is simple, low cost, requires little or no special equipment, but is inefficient and limited to tolerable in-water exposures.

Modes of decompression:

- No-stop decompression – Ascent from a dive with no obligatory decompression
- Continuous decompression – Decompression without specific stops at given depths
- Staged decompression – Ascant from dive interrupted by periods at constant depth
- Accelerated decompression – Decompresssion using oxygen-rich breathing gases
- Repetitive dive decompression – Ascent from a serial dive
- Altitude decompression – Reduction in ambient pressure due to ascent above sea level
- Gas switching – Changing the breathing gas mixture during a dive
- Surface decompression – Decompression in a diving chamber out of the water
- Closed bell decompression – Decompression in the personnel transfer capsule
- Transfer under pressure decompression – Ascent in a closed bell with further decompression in a deck chamber
- Saturation decompression – Decompression where all tissues are saturated with inert gas
- Therapeutic decompression – Decompression from hyperbaric treatment

== Atmospheric pressure diving ==
Atmospheric pressure suit and submersible modes

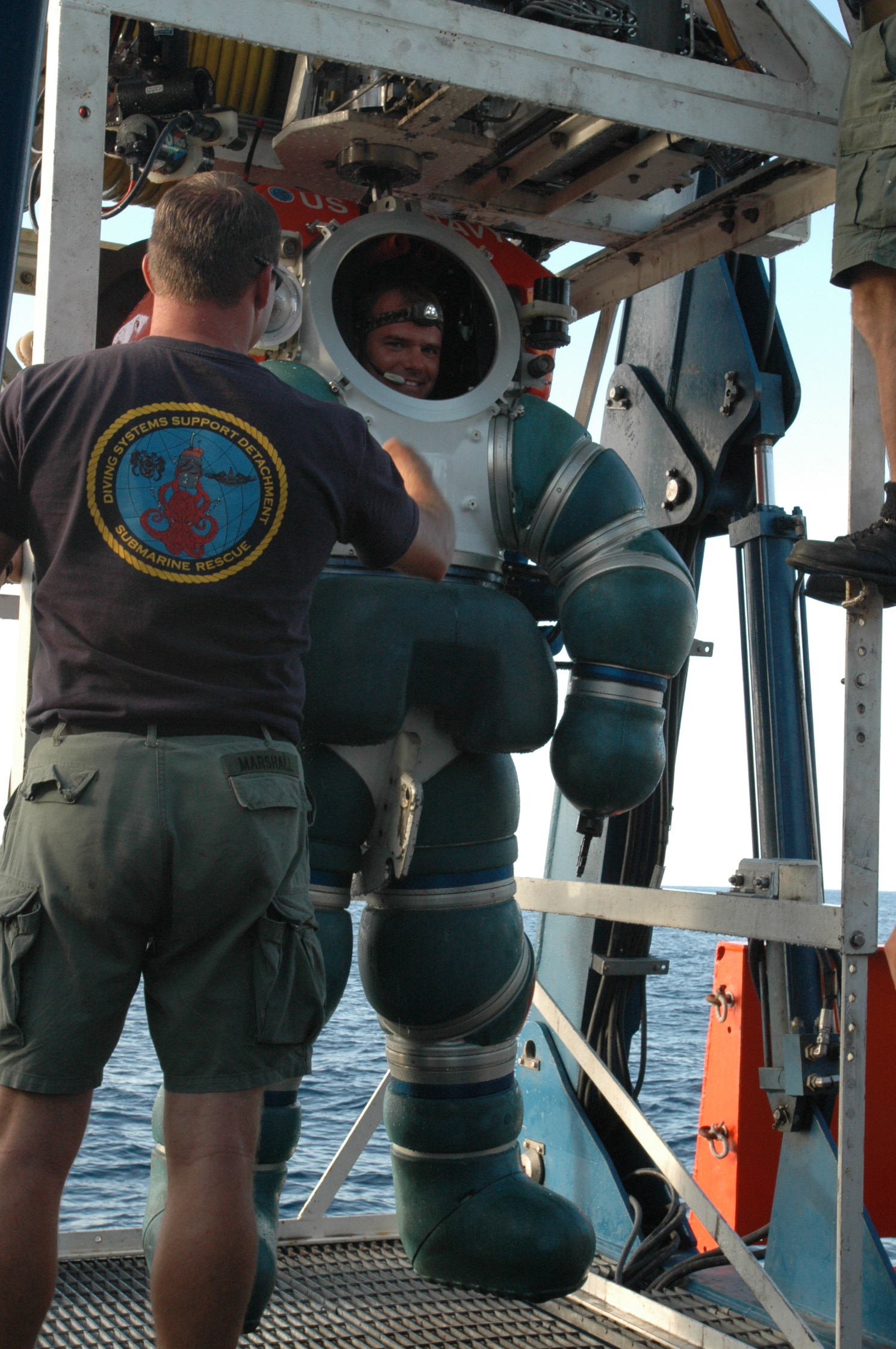
US Navy Atmospheric Diving System (ADS)

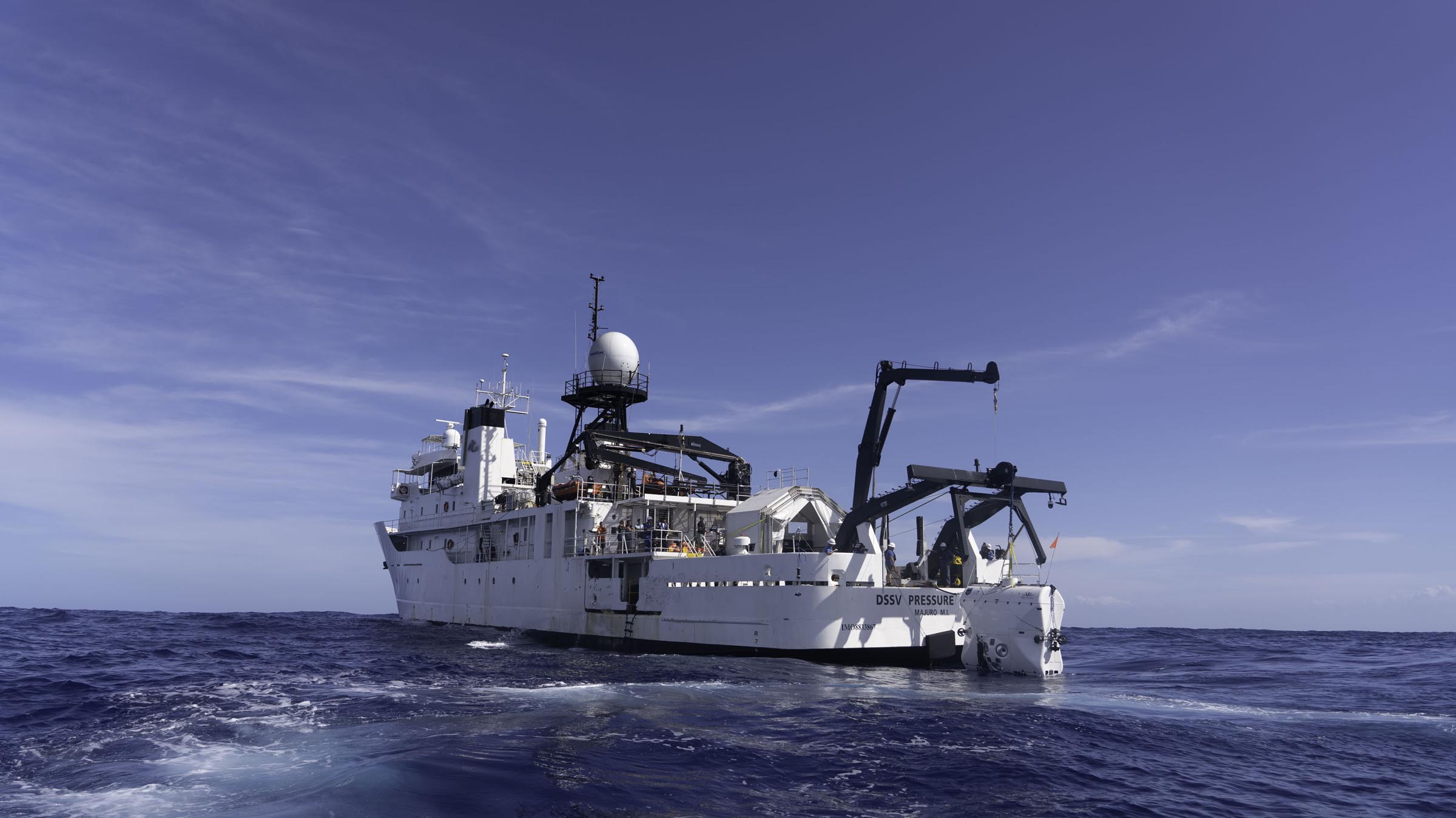
Full ocean depth rated DSV Limiting Factor prepared for a dive into the Atlantic Ocean

Submersibles and rigid atmospheric diving suits (ADS) enable diving to be carried out in a dry environment at approximately surface atmospheric pressure. An ADS is a small one-person articulated submersible which resembles a suit of armour, with elaborate joints to allow bending, while maintaining an internal pressure of one atmosphere. An ADS can be used for dives of up to about 700 metres (2,300 ft) for many hours. It eliminates the majority of physiological dangers associated with deep diving – the occupant does not need to decompress, there is no need for special gas mixtures, and there is no danger of nitrogen narcosis – at the expense of higher cost, complex logistics and loss of dexterity. Crewed submeribles have been built rated to full ocean depth and have dived to the deepest known points of all the oceans.

== Unmanned diving ==
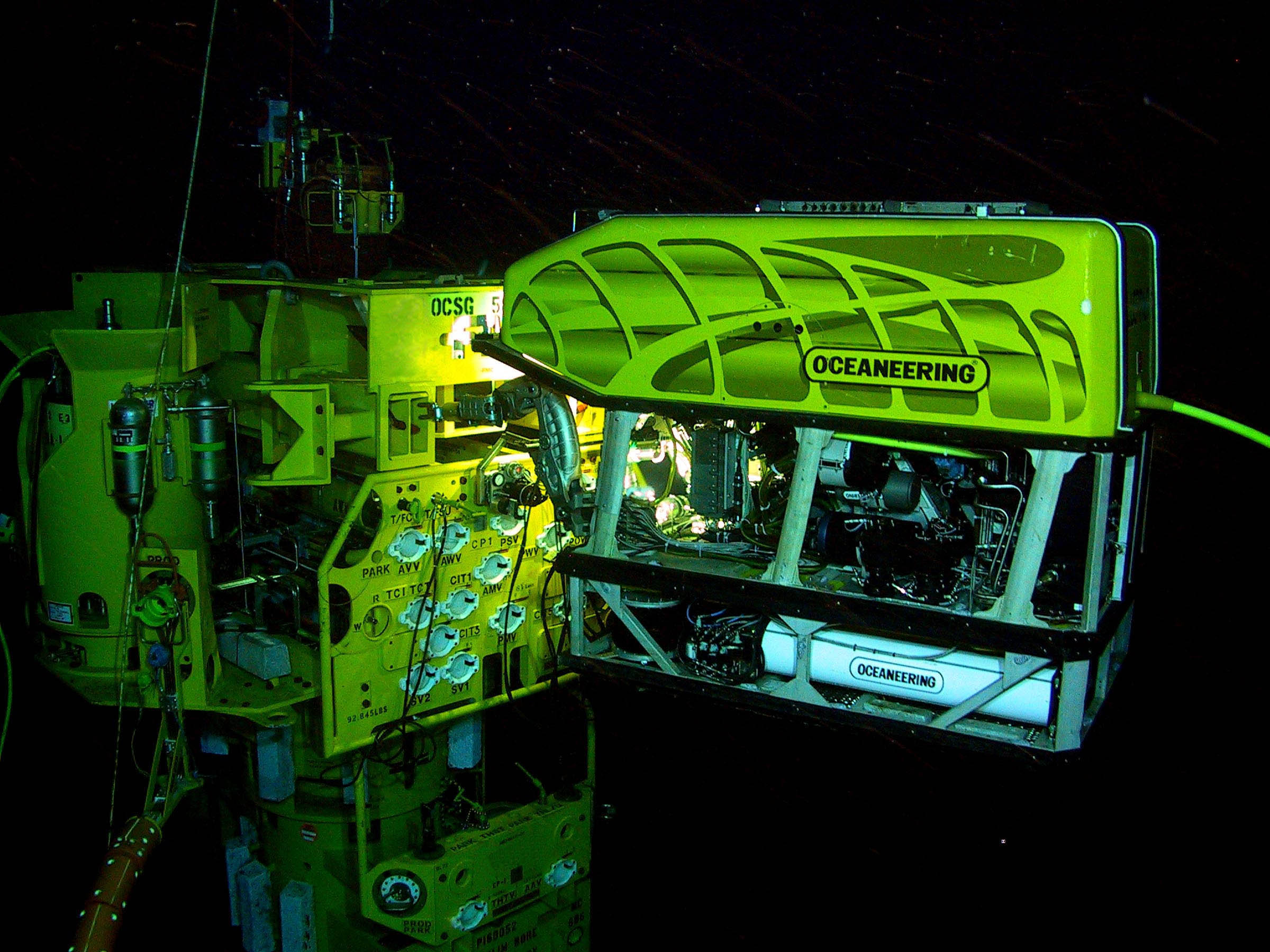
ROV working on a subsea structure

Autonomous underwater vehicles (AUVs) and remotely operated underwater vehicles (ROVs) can carry out some functions of divers. They can be deployed at greater depths and in more dangerous environments. An AUV is a robot which travels underwater without requiring real-time input from an operator. AUVs constitute part of a larger group of unmanned undersea systems, a classification that includes non-autonomous ROVs, which are controlled and powered from the surface by an operator/pilot via an umbilical or using wireless remote control. In military applications AUVs are often referred to as unmanned undersea vehicles (UUVs).

== Diving environments ==
The diving environment can influence the feasibility of use of a diving mode; particularly the level of confinement, which may physically prevent a direct vertical ascent to the surface air. This is a more immediate problem with scuba, where the diver has a limited breathing gas supply. In open-water diving there is no restriction, while in penetration diving there is an impenetrable restriction.

=== Open-water diving ===
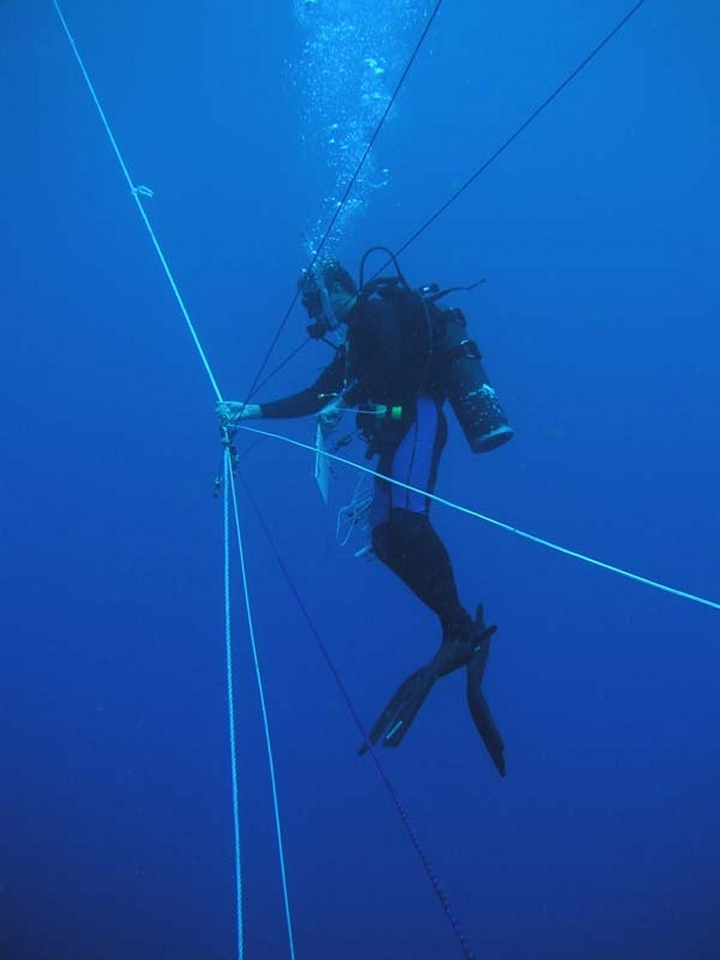
Marine scientist coordinates a blue water dive for 4 companions - each at the end of a rope tether and each rope kept taut by a weight and pulley system

The open-water diving mode refers to diving in an open water environment, where the diver has unrestricted access - by way of a direct vertical ascent - to the breathable air of the atmosphere. Other environmental hazards may exist, which do not affect the classification. In some contexts it also implies that there is no decompression obligation hindering direct ascent. This is the default mode for recreational scuba diving. Blue-water diving is open-water diving done in mid-water where the bottom is out of sight of the diver and there may be no fixed visual reference. The techniques of blue-water diving have been developed over the years to suit the conditions and address the hazards of an environment which is functionally bottomless, and has no fixed visible positional references.

=== Penetration diving ===
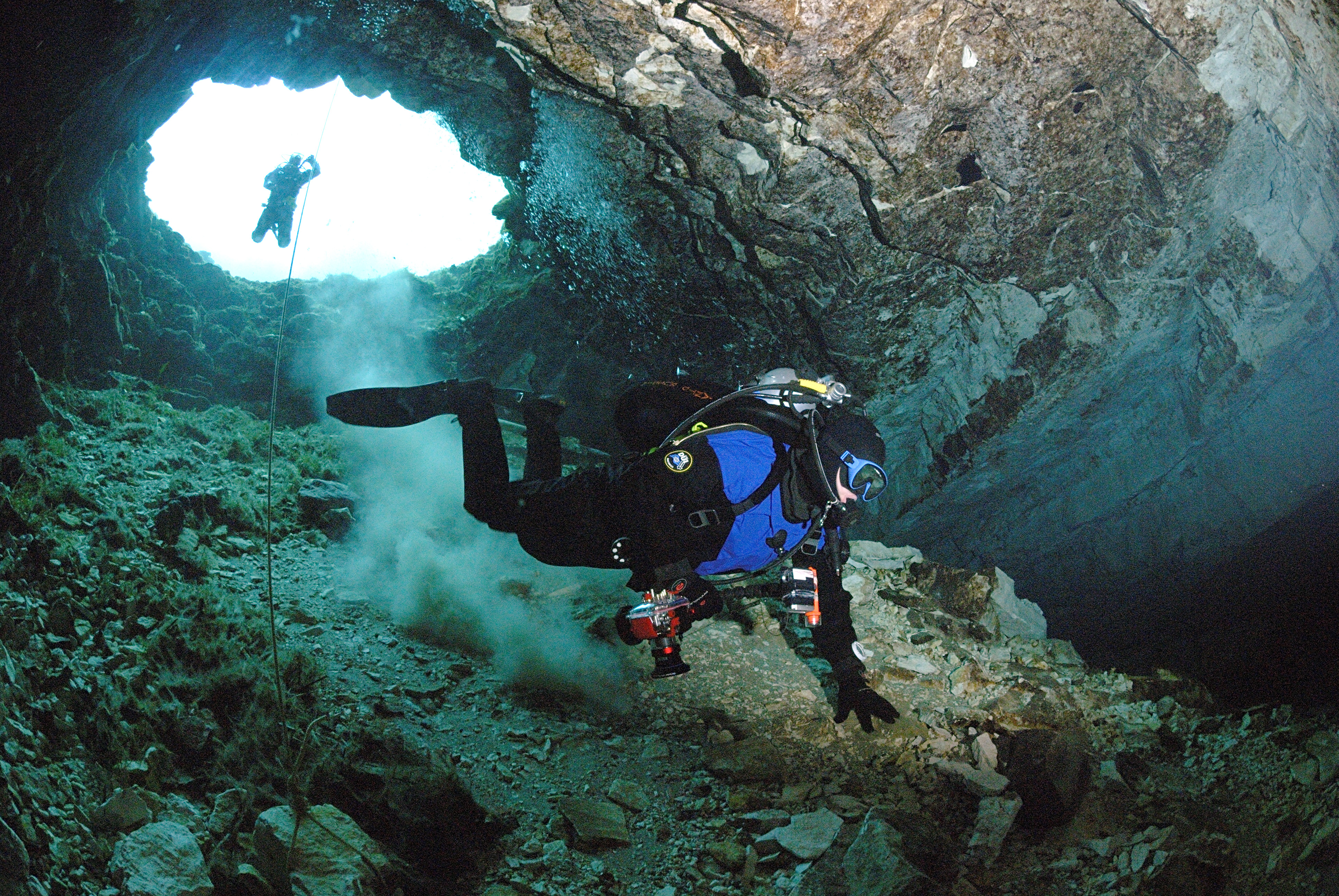
Cave diving

Penetration diving, or overhead diving, is diving under a physical overhead of any kind, where for a significant part of the dive it is not possible to ascend vertically to a free breathable air surface. Cave diving, wreck diving, ice diving and diving inside or under other natural or artificial underwater structures or enclosures are examples. The restriction on direct ascent increases the risk of diving under an overhead, and this is usually addressed by adaptations of procedures and use of equipment such as redundant breathing gas sources and guide lines to indicate the route to open water.

Surface supplied breathing gas via umbilical both reduces the risk of running out of breathing gas, and of getting lost under an overhead obstruction, as the gas supply umbilical or airline can be followed out to the entrance point, but it does increase the risk of entrapment by snagging on the environment. An underwater tending point may be required at the entrance to the enclosed space. The available and manageable length of the umbilical is an absolute limitation on penetration.

== Selection of a diving mode ==
The choice of diving mode for a given dive plan can be influenced by several factors. In recreational diving the main constraints are that the diver is competent to use the mode, that the mode is suited to the planned dive, and that the equipment and logistics are available. These constraints also apply to professional diving, but considerations of occupational safety, organisational procedural requirements, and legal constraints are added.

== See also ==
- Code of practice – Set of rules regarding behavior of people working in a particular occupation
- Diver certification – Certification as competent to dive to a specified standard
- Diver training – Processes to develop the skills and knowledge to dive safely underwater
- Diver training standard – Document describing requirements of a diver training programme
- Diving hazards – Agents and situations that pose a threat to the underwater diver
- Diving regulations – Stipulations of the delegated legislation regarding the practice of underwater diving
- Diving safety – Risk management of underwater diving activities
- Operations manual – Authoritative document of how things should be done in an organisation
- Professional diving – Underwater diving where divers are paid for their work
