= Frank H. Brumby =

Frank Hardeman Brumby
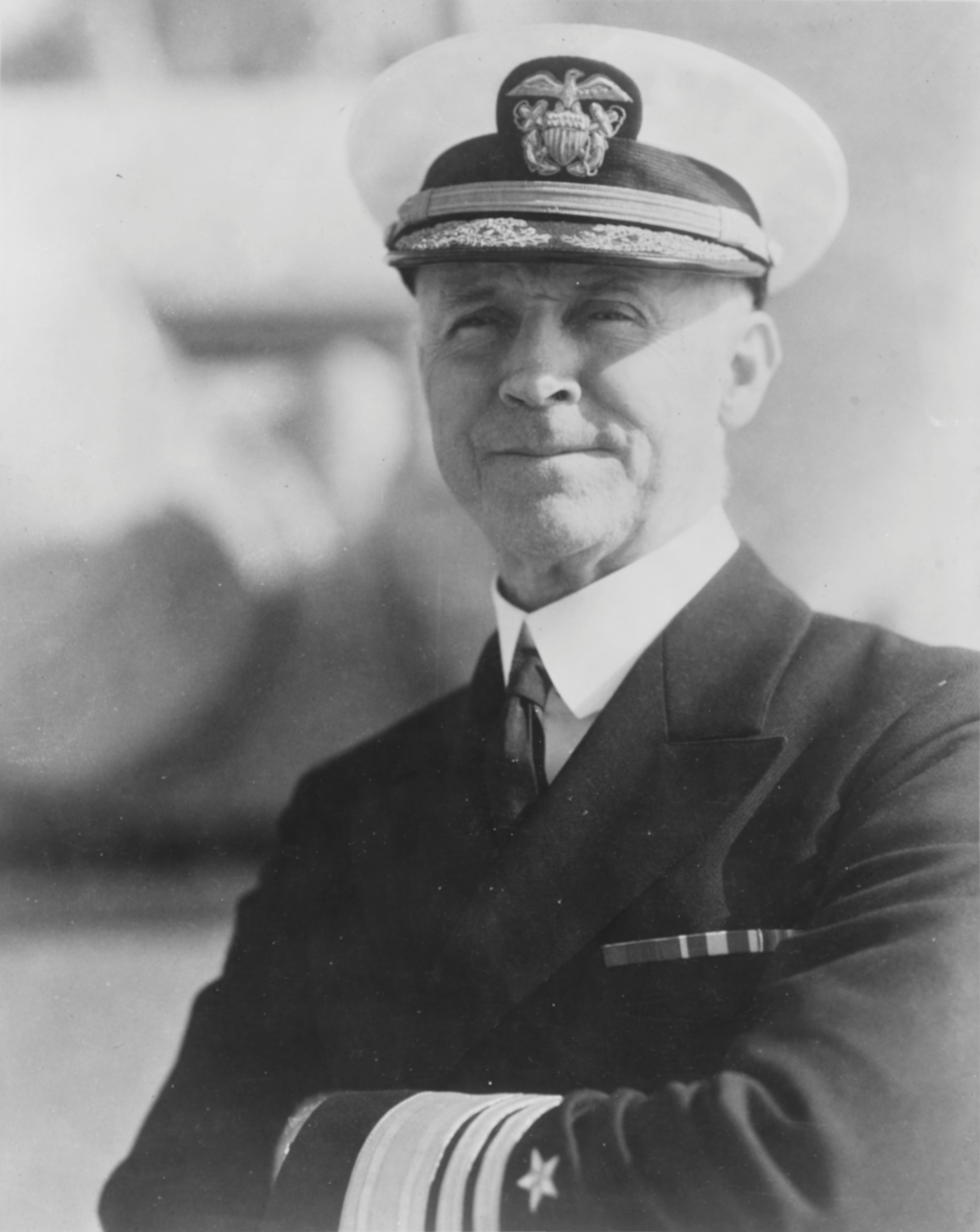
- Admiral Frank H. Brumby
- Born: September 11, 1874; Athens, Georgia, US
- Died: July 16, 1950 (aged 75); Portsmouth, Virginia, US
- Military career
- Allegiance: United States
- Branch: United States Navy
- Service years: 1895–1938
- Rank: Admiral
- Commands: Battle Force
- Conflicts: Spanish–American War; Philippine–American War; World War I

Frank Hardeman Brumby (September 11, 1874 – July 16, 1950) was a four-star admiral in the United States Navy who commanded the Battle Force of the United States Fleet from 1934 to 1935.

== Early career ==
Born in Athens, Georgia, to Belle Hardeman Brumby and former Confederate States Army officer John Wallis Brumby, he was appointed from the state of Georgia to the United States Naval Academy in 1891. Graduating 3rd of 45 in the class of 1895, he served the required two years of sea duty as a passed midshipman before being commissioned ensign on July 1, 1897.

During the Spanish–American War, Brumby was a junior officer aboard the armored cruiser New York, flagship of Rear Admiral William T. Sampson's squadron at the Battle of Santiago de Cuba, and later served during the Philippine Insurrection. He completed a course at the Naval War College in 1907.

As lieutenant commander, he served as navigator aboard the USS New Hampshire making a one-week ship visit to St. Petersburg, Russia, in May 1911. The entire wardroom was invited by Tsar Emperor Nicholas II to dinner at Peterhof Palace. Participating in the visit were: Connecticut class battleships Louisiana, Kansas, New Hampshire, and the first of the dreadnought battleships South Carolina accompanied by the coaling vessel Cyclone.

His first command was the protected cruiser Cincinnati, which he received shortly before the United States' entry into World War I, during which he was promoted to the temporary rank of captain. After the war, he commanded the battleship Kansas from 1920 to 1921 and the battleship New Mexico from 1924 to 1926. Brumby completed the senior course at the Naval War College in 1927 before being promoted to rear admiral and assigned as commander Control Force, United States Fleet and commander Submarine Divisions, Control Force.

== S-4 court of inquiry ==
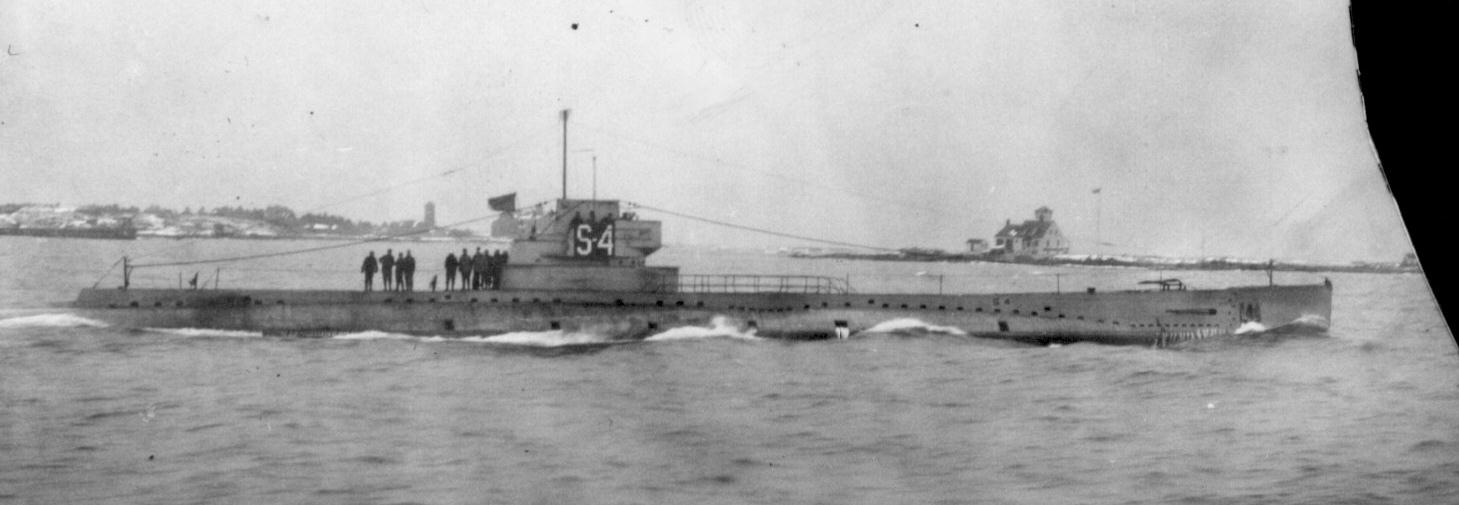
USS S-4 (SS-109)

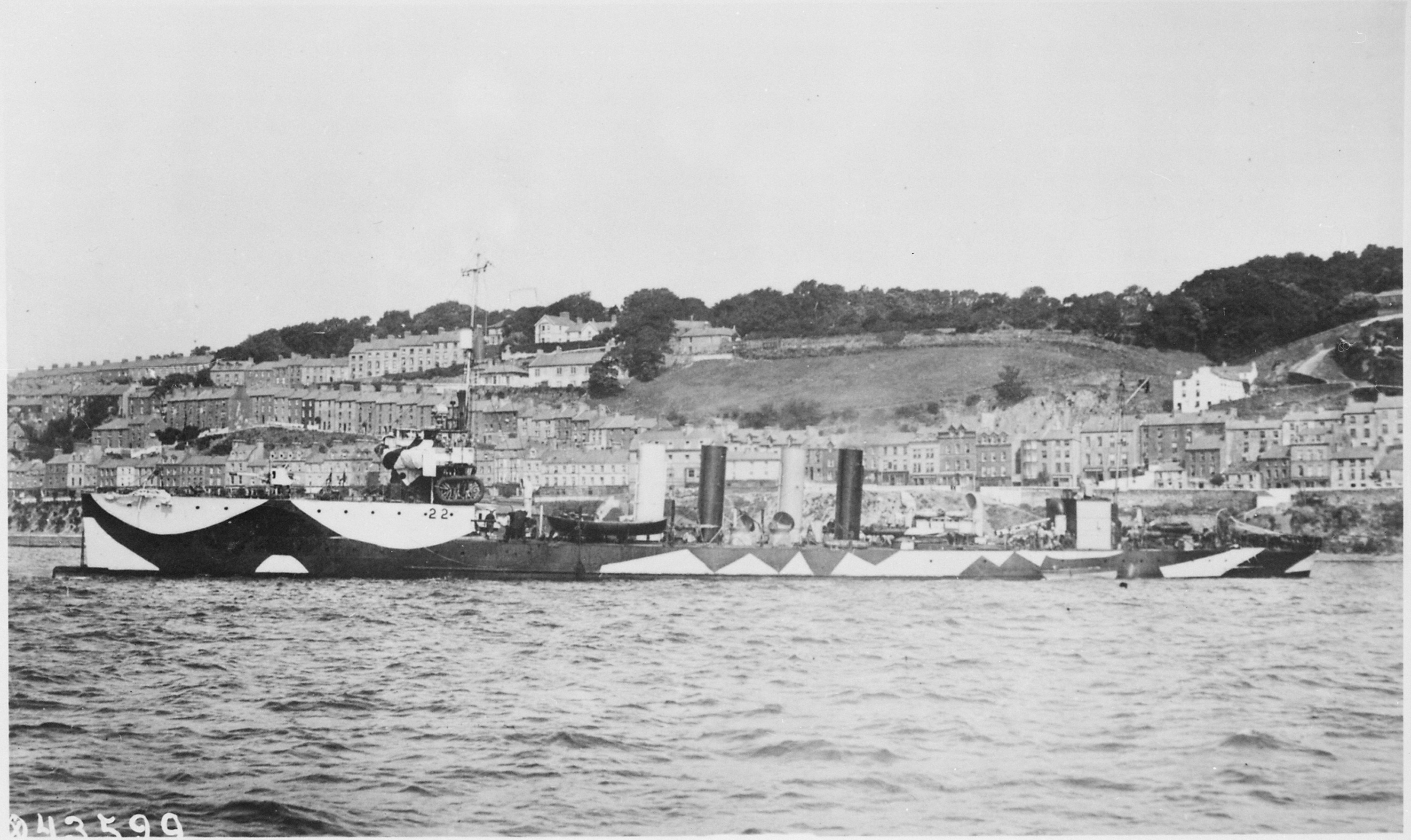
USS Paulding

On December 17, 1927, the United States Coast Guard destroyer USCGD Paulding (CG-17) accidentally rammed and sank the Control Force submarine USS S-4 (SS-109) off Provincetown, Massachusetts. Brumby took charge of the rescue effort, assisted by Captain Ernest J. King, who had recently commanded the salvage operation for the sunken submarine USS S-51. As the weather worsened, the minesweeper (later reclassified as a submarine rescue ship) USS Falcon (AM-28) attempted to attach air hoses to the sunken submarine to force it to the surface by filling its ballast tanks, or at least supply air to the six surviving crewmen, but to no avail. Finally, Brumby had to order Falcon into Provincetown Harbor to ride out the winter storm, which lasted days. The trapped crewmen died of suffocation.

Newspaper reporters flocked to Provincetown to cover the disaster as it unfolded. Brumby was swamped by letters and telegrams, all of which he answered conscientiously, although some were so abusive that King advised him to ignore them. Months later, King still refused to shake hands with a particular reporter; told of King's snub, Brumby exclaimed, "Why, King, if I had known it was that son-of-a-bitch, I would not have shaken hands with him either."

To investigate the sinking and failed rescue operation, the Navy convened a court of inquiry presided over by Rear Admiral Richard H. Jackson. Under questioning, Brumby appeared to be technically uninformed about the details of the rescue operation: "I just can't be positive about such things. I just can't remember. Ask the technical people. ... I am not familiar with the details of the construction of submarines, but those who were there thought the steps being taken were the proper ones. ... Well, I don't really know. I can't answer that question. My impression is the divers did all they could do. As to details I can't tell you. You'll have to ask the technical men."

The court concluded that while the rescue plans Brumby approved and supervised "were logical, intelligent, and were diligently executed with good judgment and the greatest possible expedition", Brumby himself had demonstrated he was unfit to command the Control Force and should be removed. "He had not the familiarity with the essential details of construction of submarines and the knowledge of rescue vessels, and the knowledge of the actual work being carried on by his subordinates necessary to direct intelligently the important operations of which he was in charge."

Professing puzzlement that the court could praise the rescue operation but condemn its commander, Secretary of the Navy Curtis D. Wilbur rejected its recommendation to remove Brumby and asked that the court reconsider Brumby's performance in more detail. Brumby redescribed his actions and Wilbur found them to be entirely "commendable", concluding that Brumby had properly consulted his technical experts and followed their consensus. Furthermore, Wilbur felt that Brumby's exemplary 31-year service record outshone whatever "errors or oversight or failures" could be inferred from his testimony.

== Fleet command ==
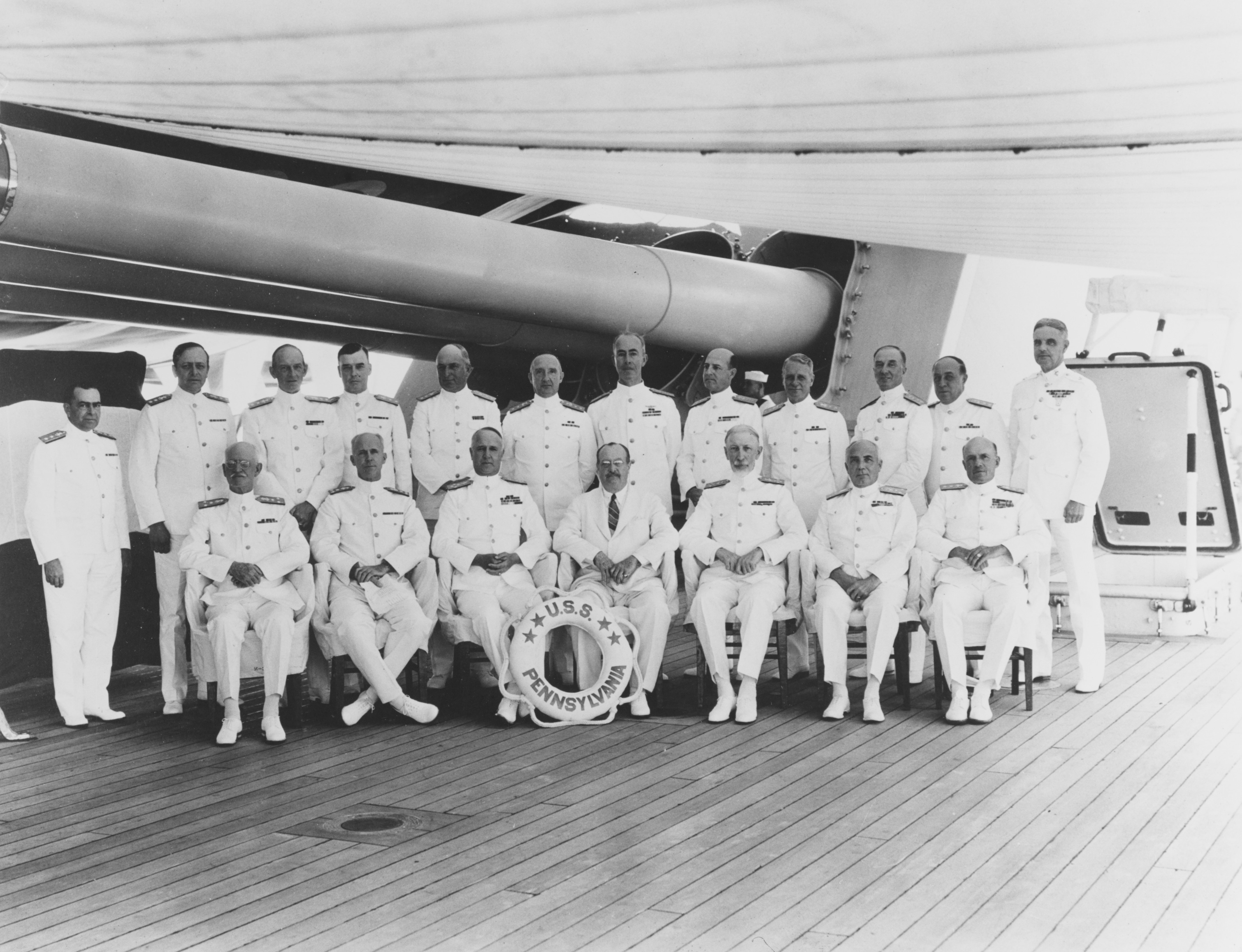
As commander Scouting Force, 1934 (seated, second from left)

After completing his normal tour as commander of the Control Force on November 6, 1928, Brumby served as president of the Board of Inspection and Survey from November 1928 to June 1929 and as commandant of the Norfolk Naval Shipyard from May 31, 1930, to September 28, 1932, before returning to sea as commander of Battleship Division 1, Battle Force, United States Fleet.

In May 1933, he was selected to succeed Vice Admiral Frank Hodges Clark as commander Scouting Force, United States Fleet (COMSCTGFOR), and was advanced to the temporary rank of vice admiral for the duration of his tour, which lasted from May 20, 1933, to June 14, 1934. The highlight of his tour was Exercise M, a phase of the annual fleet maneuvers that studied control of the Caribbean Sea. Brumby commanded the Grey Fleet, assigned to defend against an amphibious assault by the Blue force commanded by Admiral Joseph M. Reeves, whose objective was to take one or all of Ponce, San Juan, Culebra and St. Thomas, and who finally succeeded in landing marines on Culebra on the fifth and last day of the exercise.

In 1934, Reeves was elevated to commander in chief, United States Fleet (CINCUS), and Brumby succeeded him as Commander Battle Force, United States Fleet (COMBATFOR) with the temporary rank of admiral on June 15, 1934. Fleet commands rotated every year and it was common for COMBATFOR to be promoted to CINCUS, as Reeves had been, but when Brumby's year as COMBATFOR was up, Reeves was reappointed to a second year as CINCUS, so Brumby relinquished command of the Battle Force to Admiral Harris Laning on April 1, 1935, and returned to shore in his permanent rank of rear admiral.

His last assignment was as commandant of the Fifth Naval District and the Naval Operating Base at Norfolk, which he commanded from April 8, 1935, to September 30, 1938 before retiring on October 1, 1938, after forty-five years of service. He was advanced to the rank of admiral on the retired list on June 16, 1942, by new legislation which allowed officers to retire in the highest active-duty rank in which they had served.

== Personal life ==
Brumby married the former Isabelle Truxtun on June 4, 1907, and they had two children, Isabelle Truxtun Brumby Fitzgerald and Navy officer Frank Hardeman Brumby Jr. An uncle, Lieutenant Thomas Mason Brumby, was flag lieutenant to Rear Admiral George Dewey during the Spanish–American War.

In retirement, Brumby resided in Norfolk, Virginia. He died at the age of 75 at the Norfolk Naval Hospital in Portsmouth, Virginia, after a two-week illness attributed to complications following an operation.

== Namesake and honors ==
He is the namesake of the destroyer escort Brumby, launched in 1963 and co-sponsored by two granddaughters. The Brumby Bowl, the annual golf championship tournament of the Norfolk Naval Shipyard Golf Association, is also named for him, as the shipyard commandant when the tournament began in 1931.

== See also ==
Preceded by Joseph M. Reeves	Commander, Battle Force; June 15, 1934 – April 1, 1935	Succeeded by Harris Laning
