= Thomas Eadie =

United States Navy Medal of Honor recipient

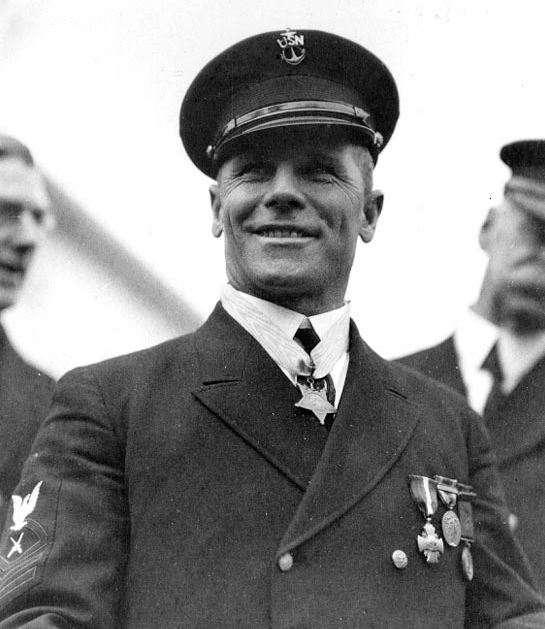
- Chief Gunner's Mate Thomas Eadie, January 1928
- Born: April 8, 1887; Glasgow, Scotland, United Kingdom
- Died: November 14, 1974 (aged 87); Brockton, Massachusetts, United States
- Burial place: Island Cemetery, Newport, Rhode Island
- Military career
- Allegiance: United States of America
- Branch: United States Navy
- Service years: 1905 – 1939, 1942 – 1946
- Rank: Lieutenant
- Unit: USS Falcon
- Awards: Medal of Honor; Navy Cross (2); World War I Victory Medal

Thomas Eadie (April 8, 1887 – November 14, 1974) was a United States Navy diver and a recipient of America's highest military decoration - the Medal of Honor.

== Biography ==
Thomas Eadie was born on April 8, 1887, in Glasgow, Scotland. He enlisted in the United States Navy on July 6, 1905, and was eventually rated as a Gunner's Mate and was also trained as a diver.

While serving as a Chief Gunner's Mate in the 1920s, he assisted in salvage work on the sunken submarines USS S-51 and USS S-4, receiving the Navy Cross for each operation, and the Medal of Honor for extraordinary heroism in rescuing a fellow diver on the S-4 on December 18, 1927.

Eadie retired from active duty on February 1, 1939. He returned to active service during World War II on April 30, 1942, receiving appointment as Chief Gunner (Warrant Officer). He was promoted to ensign on August 15, 1942, and to lieutenant on July 1, 1944. He retired with that rank in September 1946.

Thomas Eadie died at Brockton, Massachusetts, on November 14, 1974, and was buried in Island Cemetery annex in Newport, Rhode Island. There is a plaque in his honor at the First Presbyterian Church in Newport and Eadie Street in Newport is named after him.

== Award citations ==
=== Medal of Honor citation ===
The official Medal of Honor citation for Chief Gunner's Mate Thomas Eadie is as follows:

For display of extraordinary heroism in the line of his profession above and beyond the call of duty on 18 December 1927, during the diving operations in connection with the sinking of the U.S.S. S-4 with all on board, as a result of a collision off Provincetown, Mass. On this occasion when MICHELS, Chief Torpedoman, United States Navy, while attempting to connect an air line to the submarine at a depth of 102 feet became seriously fouled, EADIE, under the most adverse diving conditions, deliberately, knowingly and willingly took his own life in his hands by promptly descending to the rescue in response to the desperate need of his companion diver. After two hours of extremely dangerous and heartbreaking work, by his cool, calculating and skillful labors, he succeeded in his mission and brought MICHELS safely to the surface.

=== 1st Navy Cross ===
The official citation for Chief Gunner's Mate Thomas Eadie's first Navy Cross is as follows:

For extraordinary heroism and devotion to duty on the occasion of the salvaging of the U.S.S. S-51.

=== 2nd Navy Cross ===
The official citation for Chief Gunner's Mate Thomas Eadie's second Navy Cross is as follows:

For extraordinary heroism and fearless devotion to duty during the diving operations in connection with the salvage of the U.S.S. S-4 sunk as a result of a collision off Provincetown, Massachusetts, 17 December 1927. During the period, 17 December 1927 to 17 March 1928, on which latter date the ill-fated vessel was raised, Eadie, under the most adverse weather conditions, at the risk of his life, descended many times into the icy waters and displayed throughout that fortitude, skill, determination and courage which characterizes conduct above and beyond the call of duty.

In addition to the above, Eadie also received the Navy Good Conduct Medal, Victory Medal, American Campaign Medal and World War Two Victory Medal.

== See also ==
- List of Medal of Honor recipients
- List of Medal of Honor recipients during Peacetime
