= SC21 =

SC21 or SC-21 may refer to:

- SC21 (United States), a United States Navy program of the 1990s for new ship designs
- USS SC-21, a United States Navy submarine chaser commissioned in 1917 and sold in 1921
- South Carolina Highway 21
- Scandium, chemical element, symbol Sc and atomic number 21
