= Frank William Crilley =

United States Navy Medal of Honor recipient

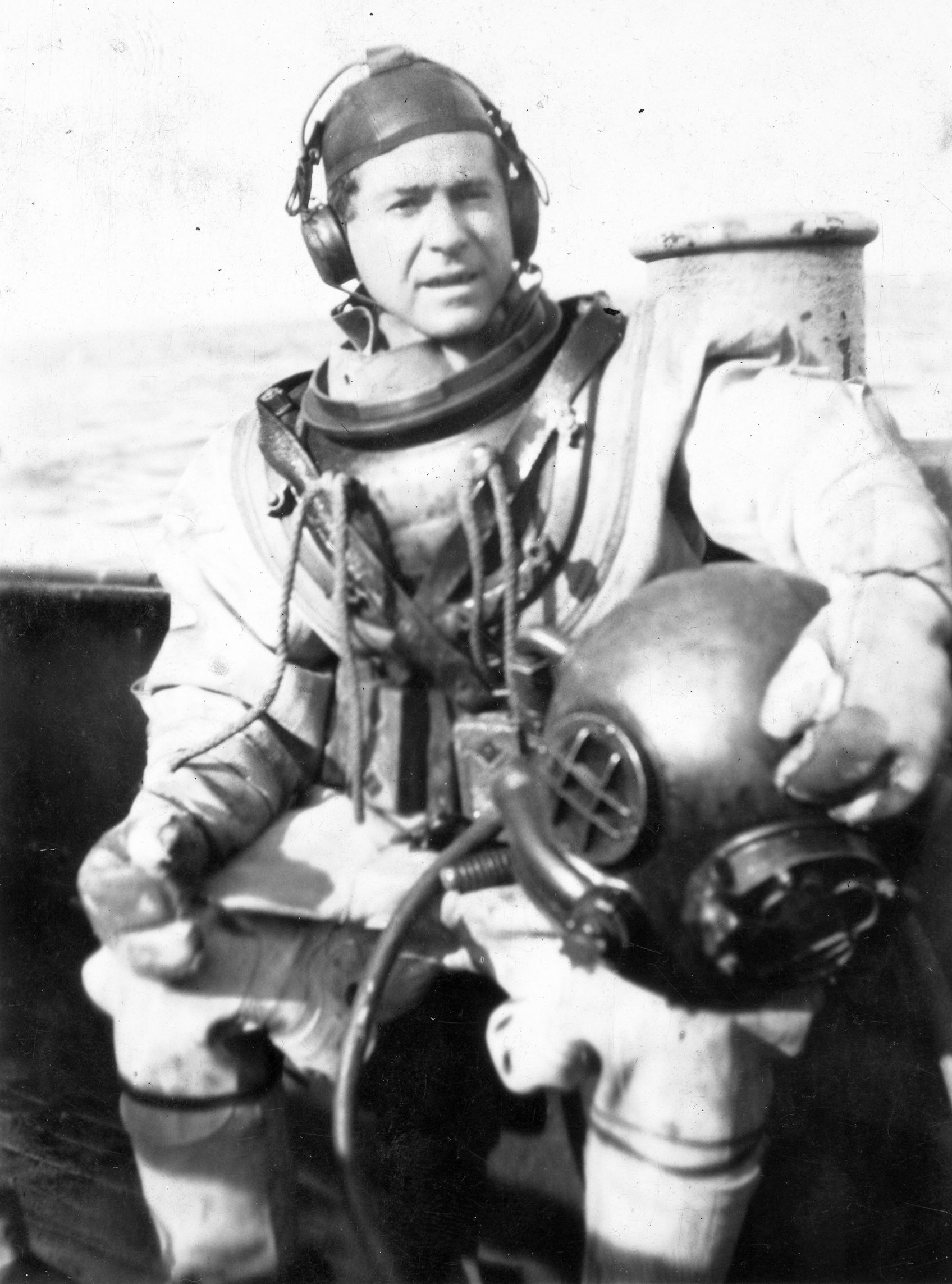
- Frank Crilley wearing diving gear
- Born: September 13, 1883; Trenton, New Jersey
- Died: November 23, 1947 (aged 64); New York City, New York
- Military career
- Allegiance: United States
- Branch: United States Navy
- Service years: 1900–1932
- Rank: Ensign
- Awards: Medal of Honor; Navy Cross

Frank William Crilley (September 13, 1883 – November 23, 1947) was a United States Navy diver and a recipient of the United States military's highest decoration, the Medal of Honor.

== Biography ==
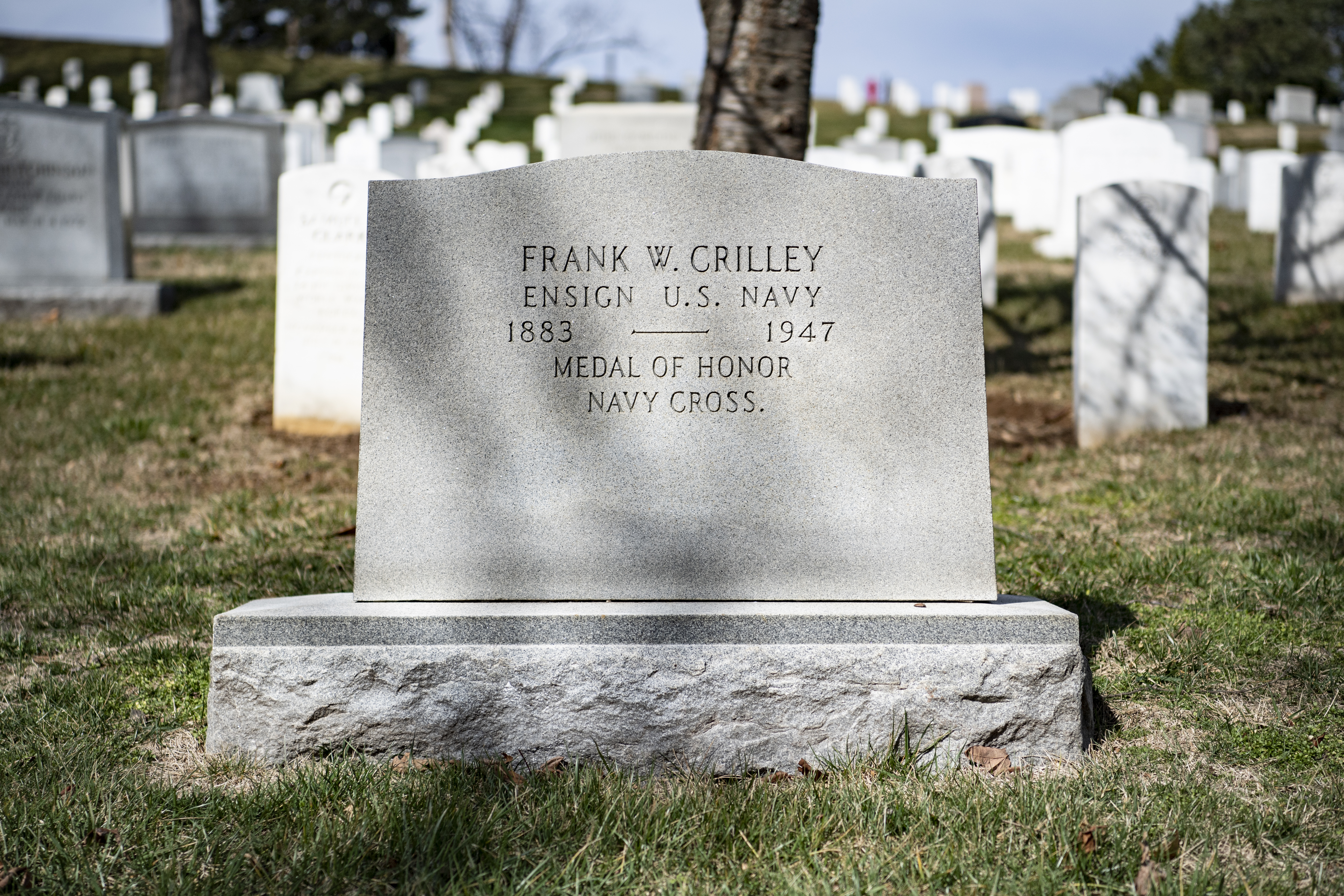
Grave at Arlington National Cemetery

Crilley was born in Trenton, New Jersey, on September 13, 1883. After enlisting in the U.S. Navy in March 1900, he became a gunner's mate and received additional training as a diver.

On April 17, 1915, Crilley, by then a chief gunner's mate, participated in a dive to inspect the wreck of the submarine USS F-4 (SS-23) in preparation for a salvage operation. The F-4 had sunk weeks earlier in 300 feet (91 m) of water off the coast of Honolulu, Hawaii. Another diver, Chief Gunner's Mate William F. Loughman, became trapped underwater while returning to the surface after examining one of the F-4's hawsers. Loughman's lifeline and air hose became tangled in the hawser, preventing him from either ascending or descending. Crilley voluntarily dove down and untangled the lines, allowing Loughman to be pulled to safety. For these actions, he was awarded the Silver Lifesaving Medal in April 1916 and the Medal of Honor on November 19, 1928, thirteen years after the rescue. The latter award was formally presented to him on the White House grounds by President Calvin Coolidge on February 15, 1929.

In 1917, Crilley was appointed to the warrant officer rank of Gunner(T), and in February 1918 became an ensign in the Naval Reserve. He commanded USS Salvor (SP-3418) in 1919 and left active duty in July of that year. In the mid-1920s, he was involved with salvaging USS S-51 (SS-162), and returned to active naval service in 1927-28 to work on the recovery of USS S-4 (SS-109). He was awarded the Navy's second-highest decoration, the Navy Cross, for his actions as a diver during that operation.

In 1931, Crilley served as second officer and master diver during the Arctic expedition of the civilian submarine Nautilus (previously known as USS O-12). Also in 1931, he assisted with the salvage of USS Mayflower (PY-1). Transferred to the retired list in May 1932, he was again employed on Navy work in 1939, during the salvage of USS Squalus (SS-192).

Crilley died at the Naval Hospital in Brooklyn, New York, on November 23, 1947. He was buried at Arlington National Cemetery.

== Medal of Honor citation ==
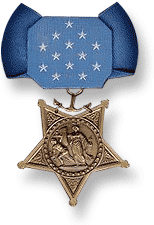

Citation:

For display of extraordinary heroism in the line of his profession above and beyond the call of duty during the diving operations in connection with the sinking in a depth of water 304 feet, of the U.S.S. F-4 with all on board, as a result of loss of depth control, which occurred off Honolulu, T.H., on 25 March 1915. On 17 April 1915, William F. Loughman, chief gunner's mate, U.S. Navy, who had descended to the wreck and had examined one of the wire hawsers attached to it, upon starting his ascent, and when at a depth of 250 feet beneath the surface of the water, had his lifeline and air hose so badly fouled by this hawser that he was unable to free himself; he could neither ascend nor descend. On account of the length of time that Loughman had already been subjected to the great pressure due to the depth of water, and of the uncertainty of the additional time he would have to be subjected to this pressure before he could be brought to the surface, it was imperative that steps be taken at once to clear him. Instantly, realizing the desperate case of his comrade, Crilley volunteered to go to his aid, immediately donned a diving suit and descended. After a lapse of time of 2 hours and 11 minutes, Crilley was brought to the surface, having by a superb exhibition of skill, coolness, endurance and fortitude, untangled the snarl of lines and cleared his imperiled comrade, so that he was brought, still alive, to the surface.

== Navy Cross citation ==

Citation:

The President of the United States of America takes pleasure in presenting the Navy Cross to Chief Gunner's Mate Frank William Crilley, United States Navy, for extraordinary heroism and fearless devotion to duty during the diving operations in connection with the salvage of the U.S.S. S-4, sunk as a result of a collision off Provincetown, Massachusetts, 17 December 1927. During the period 17 December 1927 to 17 March 1928, on which latter date the ill-fated vessel was raised, Chief Gunner's Mate Crilley, under the most adverse weather conditions, at the risk of his life, descended many times into the icy waters and displayed throughout that period fortitude, skill, determination and courage which characterizes conduct above and beyond the call of duty.

== See also ==
- List of Medal of Honor recipients
- List of Medal of Honor recipients during Peacetime
