= Henry Hartley =

United States Navy officer

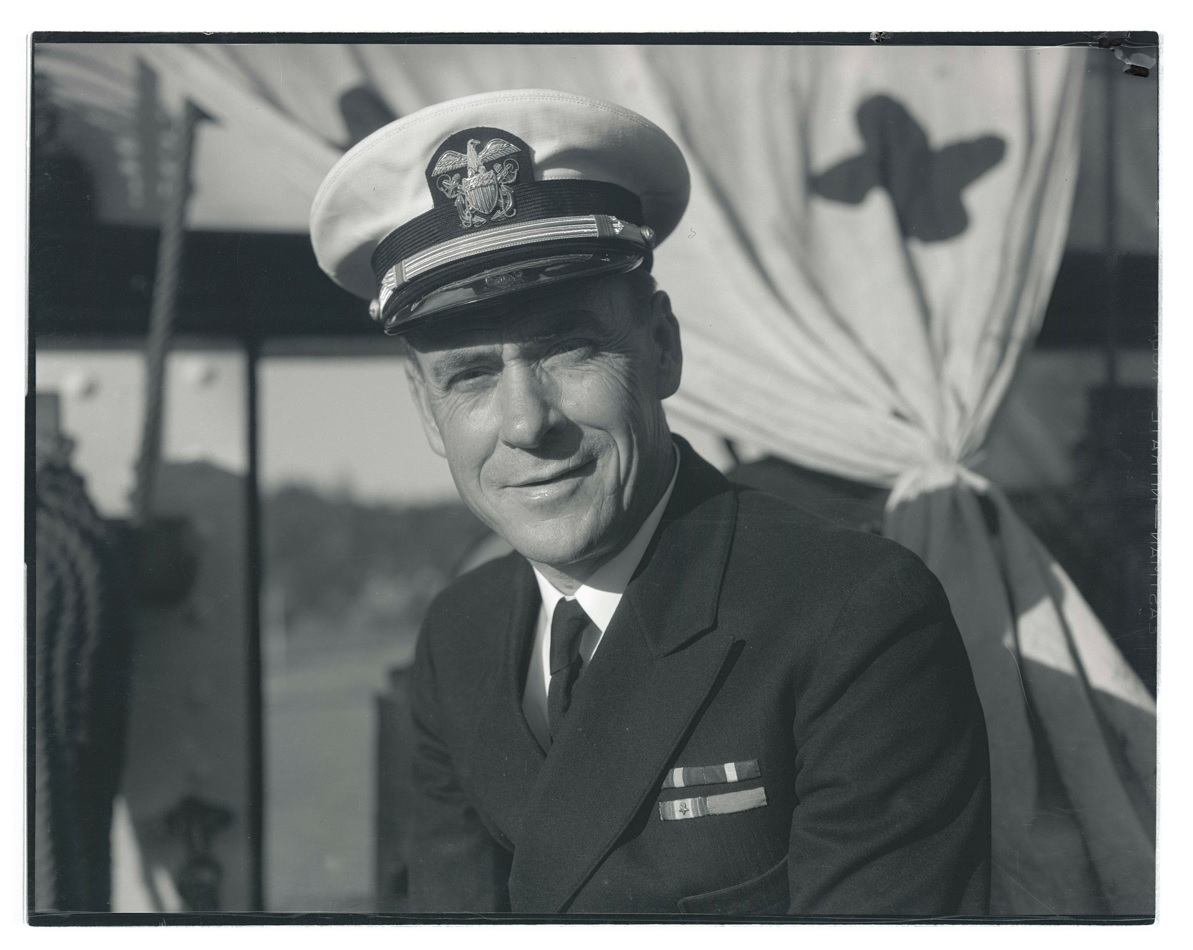
- Born: 8 May 1884; Bladensburg, Maryland, US
- Died: 6 March 1953 (aged 68); Bethesda, Maryland, US
- Burial place: Arlington National Cemetery
- Military career
- Allegiance: United States of America
- Branch: United States Navy
- Service years: 1901 – 1946
- Rank: Rear admiral
- Commands: Service Division 103; USS Chester; USS Susan B. Anthony; USS Arcturus; USS Falcon USS SC-21
- Conflicts: World War I: Battle of the Atlantic; World War II: Operation Torch; Invasion of Sicily; Battle of Leyte Gulf; Battle of Iwo Jima; Battle of Okinawa
- Awards: Navy Cross; Distinguished Service Medal; Legion of Merit (3); Navy Commendation Medal

Henry Hartley (8 May 1884 – 6 March 1953) was a highly decorated officer in the United States Navy who reached the rank of rear admiral. A veteran of both World Wars, he began his career as Apprentice seaman and rose to the rank of commodore during World War II. During his 45 years long career in the Navy, Hartley trained as Diver and was involved in research of techniques of salvage work. He distinguished himself during the salvage works on the sunken submarines USS S-51 in July 1926; USS S-4 in March 1928 and USS Squalus in May 1939, receiving the Navy Cross and Distinguished Service Medal.

During World War II, Hartley commanded the troopship USS Susan B. Anthony during the invasions in North Africa and Sicily, before being transferred to Pacific Theater as commanding officer of cruiser USS Chester. He was subsequently promoted to the rank of commodore commanding Service Division 103 during the final days of combats in Pacific. He retired in May 1946 with the rank of rear admiral.

== Early career ==
Henry Hartley was born on 8 May 1884, in Bladensburg, Maryland, as the son of plasterer George E. Hartley and Sarah E. Chaney. He attended the public schools in Bladensburg and enlisted the United States Navy at the age of 16 on 1 February 1901, as Apprentice seaman 3rd Class, the lowest rank at the time. Following the taking the Oath at Washington Navy Yard in Washington, D.C., Hartley was ordered to the Naval Station Newport, Rhode Island, for basic training. He completed the training with honors and received the gold medal, awarded to graduate apprentices for the highest standing in general naval knowledge.

He subsequently took part in the further training aboard frigates Constellation and Essex and during the following years, he received naval education through correspondence courses in English and Navigation. Hartley later attended the Seaman Gunners School at Washington Navy Yard and completed the instructions in Ordnance, Torpedoes, Mines and Electricity, and qualified in diving at the Naval Torpedo Station at Newport. He then served successively aboard destroyers and cruisers Bagley, Chauncey, Buffalo, St. Louis, North Carolina, Montana until 1915 and reached the rank of Chief Gunner's mate.

== World War I ==
In February 1915, Hartley was warranted Boatswain and ordered to the Naval Station Norfolk, Virginia, for training in minesweeping. He was subsequently assigned to USS Patapsco, a sea-going tug attached to the Mine Force, Atlantic Fleet, engaged in submarine net planting and mining experiments.

Hartley completed this duty in September 1917 and received temporary appointment to the rank of ensign shortly after the United States' entry into World War I. He was then ordered to Boston Navy Yard, Massachusetts, for duty in connection with fitting out of the submarine chaser USS SC-253 and assumed command when commissioned in October 1917. Following a few months of training and patrol duty off New London, Connecticut, Hartley was transferred to the command of submarine chaser USS SC-21 in May 1918.

He led his ship during the antisubmarine patrols with the Atlantic Fleet, before assumed duty as Aide to commander, Special Antisubmarine Force operating along the East Coast of the United States. Hartley served in this capacity aboard flagship Jouett until September 1918 when he was promoted to Lieutenant (junior grade) and assumed command of submarine chaser USS SC-342. Hartley served with that ship for few weeks before assumed duty in connection with the anti-submarines squadrons at New London, Connecticut, and while serving in this capacity, he was engaged in fitting out and in command of Eagle Boats brought from Detroit, Michigan to the Atlantic Coast.

== Interwar service and Salvage work ==
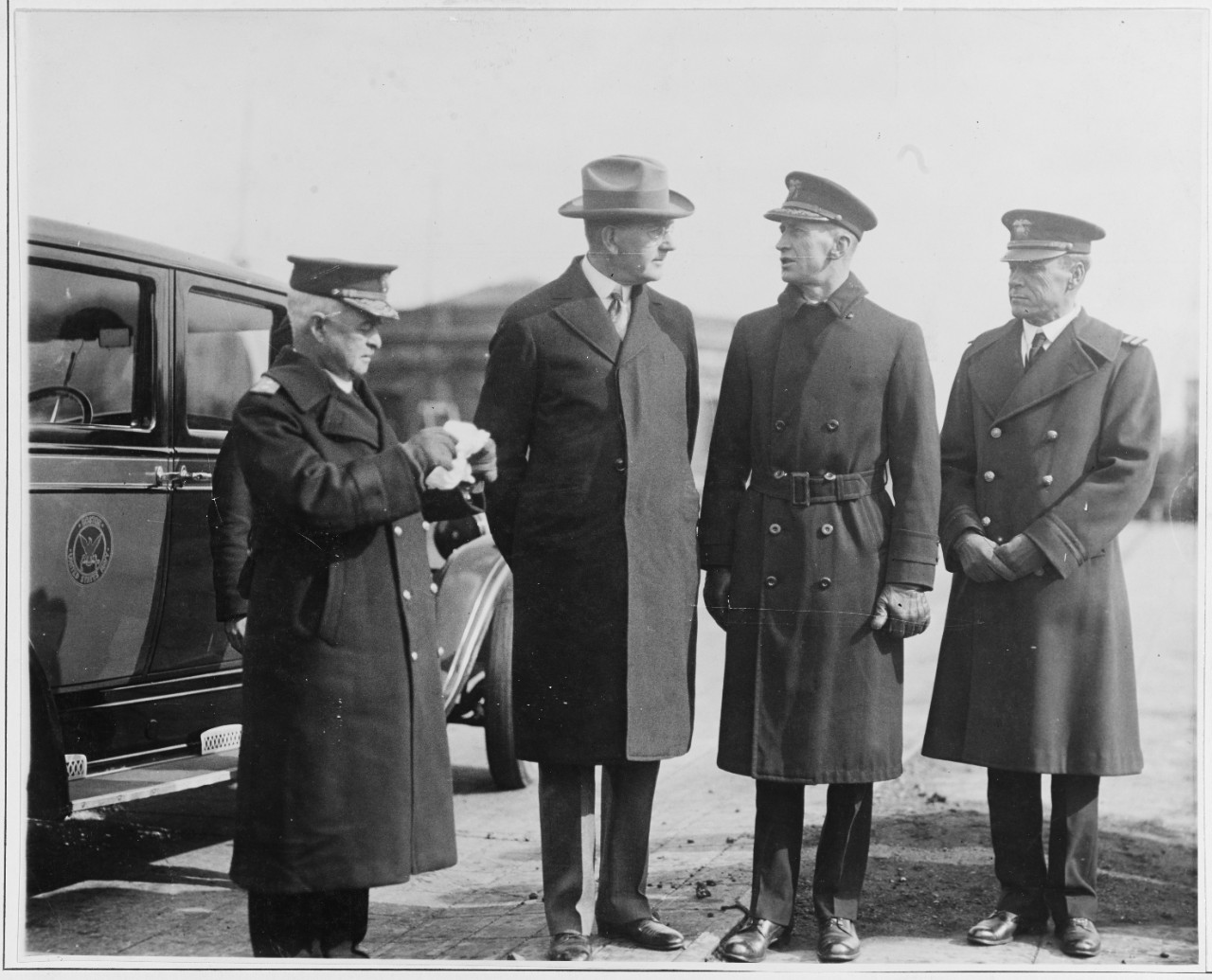
Hartley (right) during the visit of Secretary of the Navy Curtis D. Wilbur (2nd from left) during salvage work of submarine USS S-4 in March 1928. Captain Ernest King is second from right while Rear admiral Philip Andrews (left) looks on.

Hartley assumed command of Eagle Boat PE-60, when she was commissioned in October 1919 and brought her to the Engineering Experiment Station at the United States Naval Academy at Annapolis, Maryland, in early 1920. He was promoted to the permanent rank of lieutenant in August 1920 and assumed duty as executive officer of station ship Reina Mercedes under Captain Rufus F. Zogbaum Jr. While in this capacity, Hartley completed the postgraduate course in Engineering and General Line.

In October 1924, Hartley was given command of USS Falcon, first of the ships converted to submarine rescue work. He commanded the ship during the operations in the Panama Canal Zone, along the West Coast of the United States, and in the Hawaiian Islands until he was ordered to Block Island in October 1925 for salvage operation of submarine USS S-51 which was rammed and sunk following a collision with the merchant steamer City of Rome one month earlier. Hartley worked as a part of the salvage team under then-captain Ernest King and Lieutenant Commander Edward Ellsberg until 5 July 1926, when S-51 was finally raised. For his service during that operation, Hartley was decorated with the Navy Distinguished Service Medal.

Two years later, Hartley and Falcon were ordered to Provincetown, Massachusetts, for salvage of submarine USS S-4 which was accidentally rammed and sunk by the Coast Guard Destroyer Paulding in December 1927. For his service during the salvage of submarine S-4, Hartley received the Navy Cross, second-highest military decoration of the United States Navy for valor. In recognition of his service during previous salvage operations, Hartley was advanced thirty-five numbers on the Navy's Lineal list of Lieutenants.

Hartley already had a reputation of salvage expert and brilliant diver and was tasked with the organization of the Diving School at the Washington Navy Yard in July 1928. He subsequently became it first officer-in-charge and was responsible for the training of new generation of Navy Divers. Hartley also held additional duty as officer-in-charge of the Experimental Diving Unit tasked with the research.

In June 1931, Hartley was promoted to lieutenant commander and transferred to the wooden-hulled heavy frigate Constitution, the famous Old Ironsides first commissioned in 1798, reconstructed by private contributions and recommissioned in 1930. Hartley served as her executive officer and visited the ports on the Gulf of Mexico, the Panama Canal Zone; and the Pacific Coast, before returned to Boston. He was able to use his experiences gained during his training aboard the frigates Constellation and Essex back in 1902.

Hartley assumed duty as officer-in-charge, Hydrographic Office in Baltimore, Maryland with additional duty as an Instructor with the First Battalion, Naval Reserve in June 1934 and held this assignment until June 1936 when he received new sea orders. He was assigned to the aircraft carrier Saratoga under the command of Captain William F. Halsey Jr. (late Fleet Admiral) and served as his Assistant First lieutenant and Damage Control Officer during the series of exercises with the Pacific Fleet.

Following the departure of Halsey in June 1937, Hartley was promoted to commander and transferred for similar duty to cruiser Salt Lake City under Captain Allan S. Farquhar. After another year in Pacific, Hartley was appointed executive officer of Pacific Fleet repair ship Vestal in June 1938 and served under Captain Robert G. Coman until June 1939.

He was subsequently ordered to Washington, D.C., where he assumed duty as officer-in-charge of the local Hydrographic Office. After one month in Washington, Hartley's salvage work experiences was required by commandant, Portsmouth Naval Shipyard, Rear admiral Cyrus W. Cole who was responsible for the salvage work of submarine Squalus which had sunk in approximately 240 feet of water off the Isle of Shoals in March 1939. Hartley served as admiral Cole's technical aide until September 1939 while retaining his duty in Washington with the Hydrographic Office. For his service during the salvage of Squalus, Hartley received a letter of commendation from President Franklin D. Roosevelt and the Secretary of the Navy Charles Edison.

== World War II ==
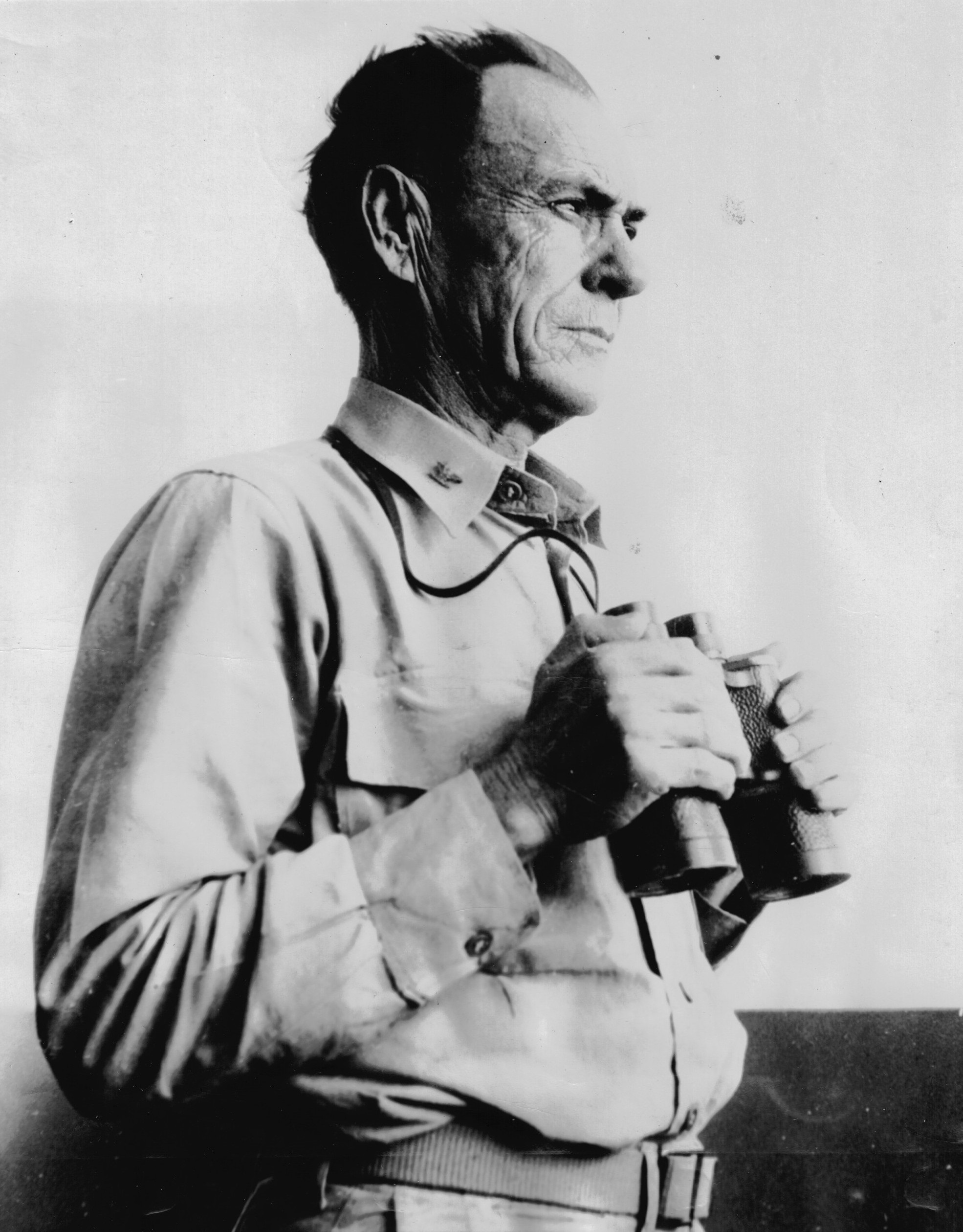
Hartley while on the bridge of cruiser USS Chester somewhere in Pacific in 1944.

In June 1941, Hartley assumed command of attack cargo ship Arcturus on patrol operations in Atlantic. At the time of Japanese Attack on Pearl Harbor and the United States entry into World War II on 7 December 1941, Hartley was still serving as commanding officer of Arcturus operating with the Atlantic Fleet along the East Coast of the United States and the Caribbean. He was promoted to the temporary rank of Captain in June 1942 and assumed command of the troopship USS Susan B. Anthony three months later.

=== North Africa ===
After assuming command of Susan B. Anthony, Hartley began with the preparation for upcoming Allied invasion in French North Africa, the Operation Torch. He spent almost a month of drills and exercises in the lower Chesapeake Bay, carrying troops and equipment; practicing loading and unloading of the cargo. Hartley and his ship were attached to the Captain Augustine H. Gray's Transport Group within the Northern Attack Group under Rear admiral Monroe Kelly and embarked for North Africa on 23 October 1942.

The Day of landing was scheduled on 8 November and Hartley's orders were to transport the elements of the U.S. Army's 9th Infantry and 2nd Armored Divisions; and special engineer units to Mehdya and Wadi Seybouse in the northern part of French Morocco. On early morning of 8 November, Susan B. Anthony successfully disembarked her troops and unloaded their equipment in relatively good order and Hartley was decorated with the Navy Commendation Medal.

Susan B. Anthony stayed in the area for a week before sailing on the 15th for Safi, Morocco to unload the rest of her cargo. On 18 November she left Safi for Norfolk, Virginia, and arrived at Hampton Roads on the last day of the month. During the next seven months Susan B. Anthony made three voyages bringing troops and supplies across the Atlantic to North Africa; the first to Casablanca and the remainder to Oran, Algeria.

=== Sicily ===
By the end of June 1943 Hartley received orders to prepare for the Invasion of Sicily and Susan B. Anthony was assigned to Transport Division Five under Captain Watson O. Bailey within Attack Group Two under Rear admiral Lyal A. Davidson. She embarked men and loaded material on 30 June – 1 July, refueled on the 2nd, and left Oran three days later.

In the morning of 9 July, Susan B. Anthony approached the coast of Sicily near the town of Scoglitti and spent the whole day with unloading the troops and cargo. Hartley's ship was attacked by enemy aircraft on following day but bombs caused only minor damage. The ship also came under the fire of enemy shore batteries but all rounds missed the target. Susan B. Anthony was subsequently able to send her salvage crew to aid broached and disabled landing craft.

On 11 July, Susan B. Anthony came under fire from enemy twin engine bomber but by the time it had closed within 1,500 yd (1,400 m), her anti-aircraft guns had shot it down in flames. Less than 10 minutes later another enemy bomber met a similar fate. In the afternoon of 12 July, Hartley received orders to embark for Oran, where he loaded prisoners; sailed for the US reaching New York City on 3 August 1943. For his service during Sicily campaign, Hartley was decorated with the Legion of Merit with Combat "V".

=== Stateside duty ===
Upon his arrival to New York City, Hartley was detached from the command of Susan B. Anthony and ordered to Norfolk, Virginia, where he joined the staff of Fleet Operational Training Command, Atlantic Fleet under Rear admiral Donald B. Beary which was responsible for the organization and training of ships' crews. Hartley assumed duty as commander, Auxiliary Vessels Shakedown Group and served in this capacity until June 1944. During that period, he initiated and developed highly efficient program, supervising the shakedown training of 93 auxiliary vessels of various types. He received his second Legion of Merit for his service in Norfolk.

=== Pacific theater ===
In early July 1944, Hartley was ordered to the Pacific theater and assumed command of cruiser Chester who just arrived to Hawaii for refit. Chester served as the flagship of Service Squadron Ten (ServRon10) under Commodore Worral R. Carter and the squadron's main task was to provide service for ships while at sea with fleet oilers, floating drydocks, and other auxiliaries. With the progress of War in Pacific, the ServRon10 took part in the naval operations during advance to Japan. Chester participated in the bombardment of Marcus Island on 9 October, before joining Task Group 38.1 for the carrier strikes on Luzon and Samar in support of the Leyte operations, as well as searching for enemy forces after the Battle for Leyte Gulf (25–26 October).

Hartley then commanded Chester during the bombardment of Iwo Jima and the Bonins, supporting the invasion landings of 19 February 1945. Following a West Coast overhaul he led his ship back to Pacific and conducted patrols off Okinawa from 27 June, as well as covering minesweeping operations west of the island. Hartley was promoted to the rank of commodore on 30 June 1945, and assumed duty as commander, Service Division 103, a subordinate unit of ServRon10.

He raised his flag aboard repair ship Luzon and began with the preparation for the Operation Downfall, the invasion of the Japanese home islands. The Surrender of Japan on 15 August 1945, prevented the operation to be launched and Hartley then took part in the Occupation of Japan until March 1946 when he was ordered back to the United States. He subsequently reported to the Office of the Chief of Naval Operations for special duty before retired from active duty on 1 May 1946, after 45 years on active duty. Hartley was subsequently advanced to the rank of rear admiral on the retired list for having been specially commended in combat.

== Retirement ==
Following his retirement from the Navy, Hartley resided in Hyattsville, Maryland, with his wife Elizabeth, before he was admitted to the Bethesda Naval Hospital, Maryland, in March 1953. Rear Admiral Hartley died on 6 March 1953, following a short illness, aged 68. He was buried with full military honors at Arlington National Cemetery, Virginia. From the marriage with his wife Elizabeth, he had a son Henry Jr. and a daughter Elizabeth. In June 1957 a Dealey-class destroyer escort in the United States Navy, Hartley was named in his honor.

== Decorations ==
Here is the ribbon bar of Rear admiral Henry Hartley:

1st Row	Navy Cross		
2nd Row	Navy Distinguished Service Medal	Legion of Merit with Combat "V" and two 5/16" Gold Stars	Navy Commendation Medal
3rd Row	Navy Good Conduct Medal with Bar	World War I Victory Medal with Destroyer Clasp	American Defense Service Medal with "A" Device
4th Row	European-African-Middle Eastern Campaign Medal with two 3/16-inch bronze service stars	American Campaign Medal	Asiatic-Pacific Campaign Medal with four 3/16-inch bronze service stars
5th Row	World War II Victory Medal	Navy Occupation Service Medal	Philippine Liberation Medal with two stars
