= USS Hartley (DE-1029) =

Dealey-class destroyer escort

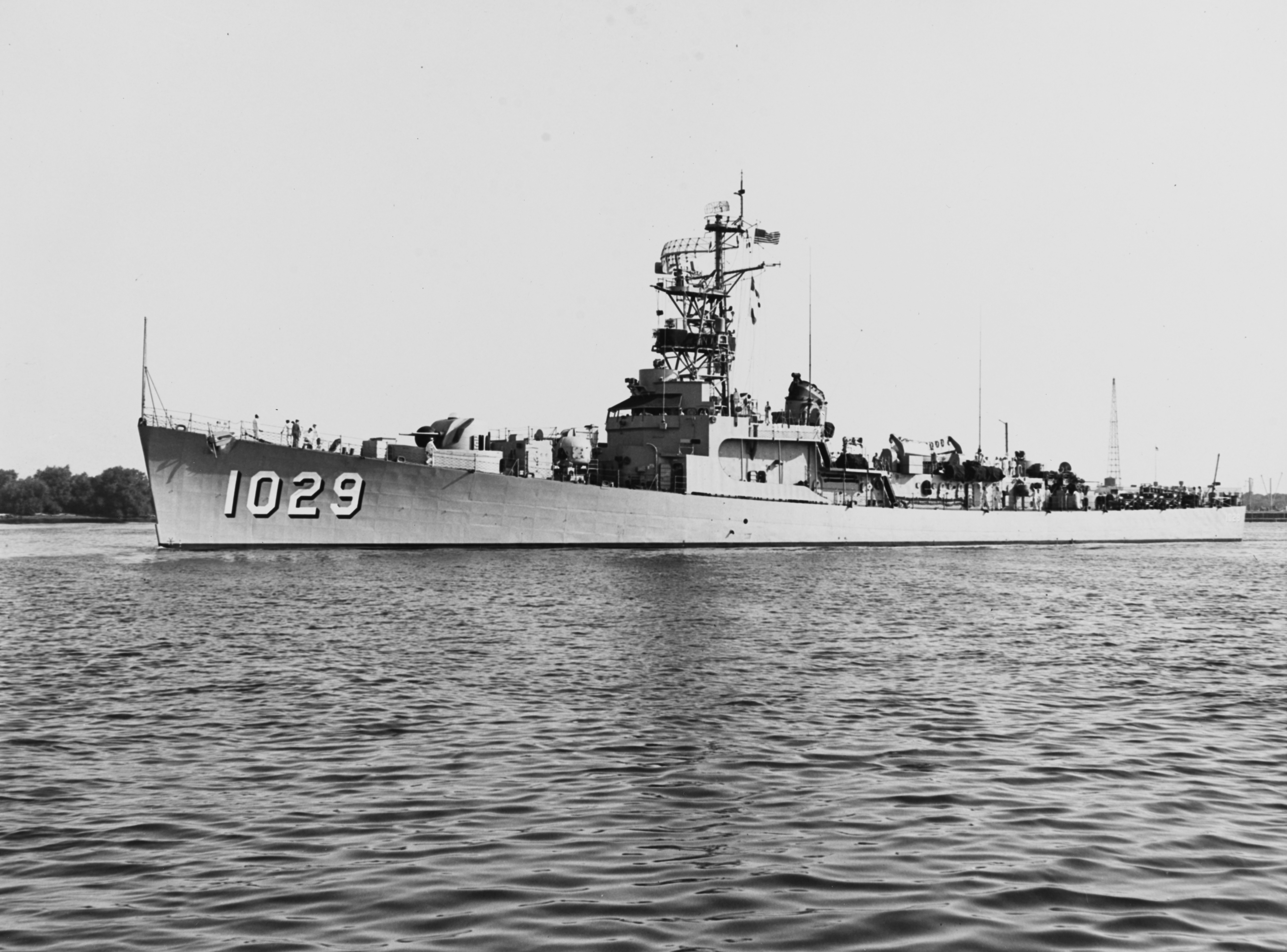
- USS Hartley (DE-1029) underway in August 1957

History

United States
- Name: USS Hartley
- Namesake: RADM Henry Hartley, USN
- Builder: New York Shipbuilding Company
- Laid down: 31 October 1955
- Launched: 24 November 1956
- Commissioned: 26 June 1957
- Decommissioned: 8 July 1972
- Stricken: 8 July 1972
- Motto: By the sword we seek peace; Meliora
- Fate: Sold to Colombia

History

Colombia
- Name: ARC Boyaca
- Acquired: 8 July 1972
- Stricken: 1994
- Identification: DE-16
- Fate: Preserved as a museum ship at Guatape, Colombia

General characteristics
- Class & type: Dealey-class destroyer escort
- Displacement: 1,270 long tons (1,290 t)
- Length: 314 ft 6 in (95.86 m)
- Beam: 36 ft 9 in (11.20 m)
- Draft: 18 ft (5.5 m)
- Propulsion: 2 × Foster-Wheeler boilers; 1 × De Laval geared turbine; 20,000 shp (15 MW); 1 shaft
- Speed: 25 knots (29 mph; 46 km/h)
- Complement: 170
- Armament: 4 × 3-inch/50 caliber guns; 1 × RUR-4 Weapon Alpha ASW rocket launched ASW bomb; DASH drone helicopter; 6 × 324 mm (12.8 in) Mark 32 torpedo tubes; Mark 46 torpedoes

USS Hartley (DE-1029) was a Dealey-class destroyer escort in the United States Navy. DE-1029 was the second ship to bear the name Hartley; she was named for Rear admiral Henry Hartley.

USS Hartley was laid down by the New York Shipbuilding Company, Camden, New Jersey, 31 October 1955; launched 24 November 1956; sponsored by Mrs. Henry Hartley, widow of Admiral Hartley; and commissioned 26 June 1957 at Philadelphia.

== Service history ==
=== 1950s ===
After shakedown in the Caribbean to test her antisubmarine equipment, Hartley joined Escort Squadron 14 in Newport, Rhode Island, for a series of ASW and convoy tactics exercises on 28 January 1958. Departing Newport on 12 May in company with CortRon 14, CortRon 10, and the aircraft carrier Wasp, Hartley deployed to the Mediterranean for operations with the 6th Fleet. During the Lebanese crisis in July she patrolled off the coast of Lebanon. For the next 2 months she continued peace-keeping patrols and ranged the Mediterranean from Turkey to France. She returned to Newport on 7 October.

After a series of ASW exercises out of her home port, Hartley sailed with CortRon 14 for an extended South American cruise 6 February 1959. United States Navy units joined ships from the Brazilian, Argentine, Uruguayan, and Venezuelan navies for intensive ASW training exercises. Hartley returned to Newport 5 May 1959 and engaged in further escort and ASW exercises until June 1960, when she entered Monroe Shipyard, Chelsea, Massachusetts, for installation of a new high-speed sonar dome. Hartley then served as Fleet Sonar School training ship at Key West, Florida, until November 1960.

=== Cuban Missile Crisis ===
Antisubmarine exercises out of Newport filled Hartley's schedule for the following 4 years, punctuated by occasional special operations. In October 1961, Hartley sailed to Norfolk to work with NASA research teams in improving shipboard recovery and space capsule egress procedures for American astronauts. After another tour with the Sonar School at Key West, Hartley prepared for BEAGLE II, a joint Canadian-American exercise which was cancelled because of the Cuban Missile Crisis in October 1962. In response to the Russian attempt to establish offensive missile bases in Cuba the United States established a naval blockade off Cuba.

=== 1960s ===
From 1962 on, Hartley continued operating in the Atlantic and the Caribbean. In March 1963, she conducted surveillance patrols off Cuba, and during the next 5 months she participated in extensive ASW exercises out of Key West and Newport. Early in September she entered the Boston Naval Shipyard where she underwent overhaul and modification. Equipped with the latest advances in sonar equipment and DASH, Hartley resumed duty 27 January 1964. During February and March she trained out of Guantánamo Bay and served at the Sonar School at Key West. Returning to Newport 8 April, she spent the remainder of the year participating in antisubmarine exercises which sent her from the Gulf of Maine to the Straits of Florida.

After conducting surveillance patrols and sonar training out of Key West during the early part of 1965, she was heavily damaged by the Norwegian freighter Blue Master 16 June. As Hartley entered Chesapeake Bay in heavy weather, the merchantman hit the destroyer escort broadside, and her bow almost cut Hartley in half. She suffered no casualties but was extensively damaged in the engineering spaces. Rescue and salvage operations kept her from grounding; 19 hours after the collision, she reached Norfolk under tow.

After extensive repairs at Norfolk Navy Yard, Hartley returned to Newport early in October. There she resumed antisubmarine operations.

Hartley operated out of Newport along the New England coast and in the Caribbean until she sailed for Northern Europe late in May 1967. After cruising along the Scandinavian coast, she arrived at Copenhagen on 23 June. She next visited Holy Loch, Scotland, before getting underway 17 July for the Mediterranean.

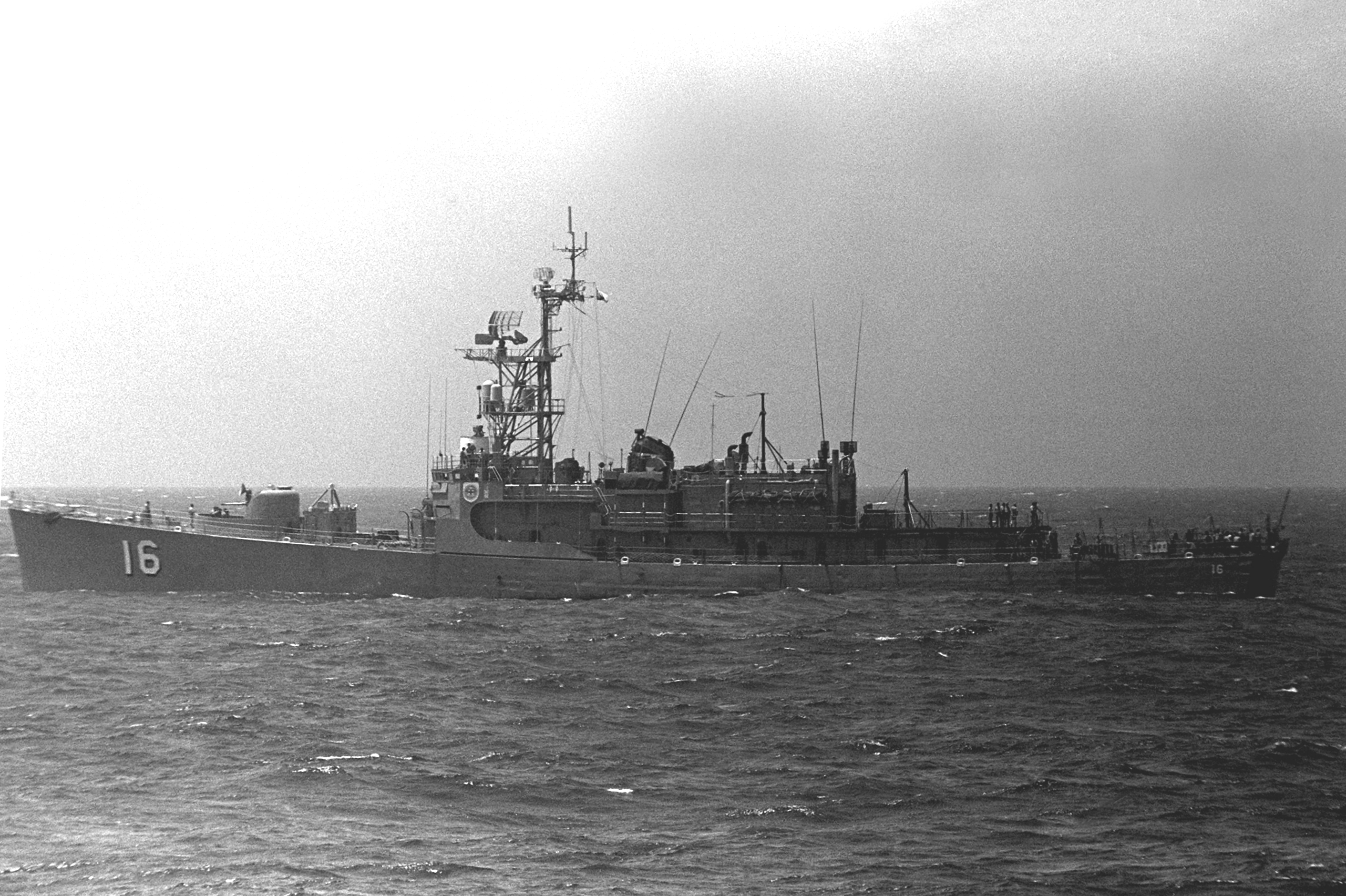
Hartley as Colombian Boyaca (DE-16) in 1979.

== Transfer to Colombian Navy and fate ==
She was sold on 8 July 1972 to Colombia and renamed Boyaca, bearing the hull designation DE-16. She was stricken from the Colombian record in 1992 and was intended to be preserved as a museum ship at Guatape.

The ship was dismantled and trucked to a mountain location on the shores of Lake Guatape in anticipation of being reassembled as a land ship. Due to funding limitations, the project has been on hold since. As of 28, Sept. 2015, the remains of the Boyaca have been removed and there are houses being constructed on the site.
