= USS Chester (CA-27) =

Northampton-class heavy cruiser

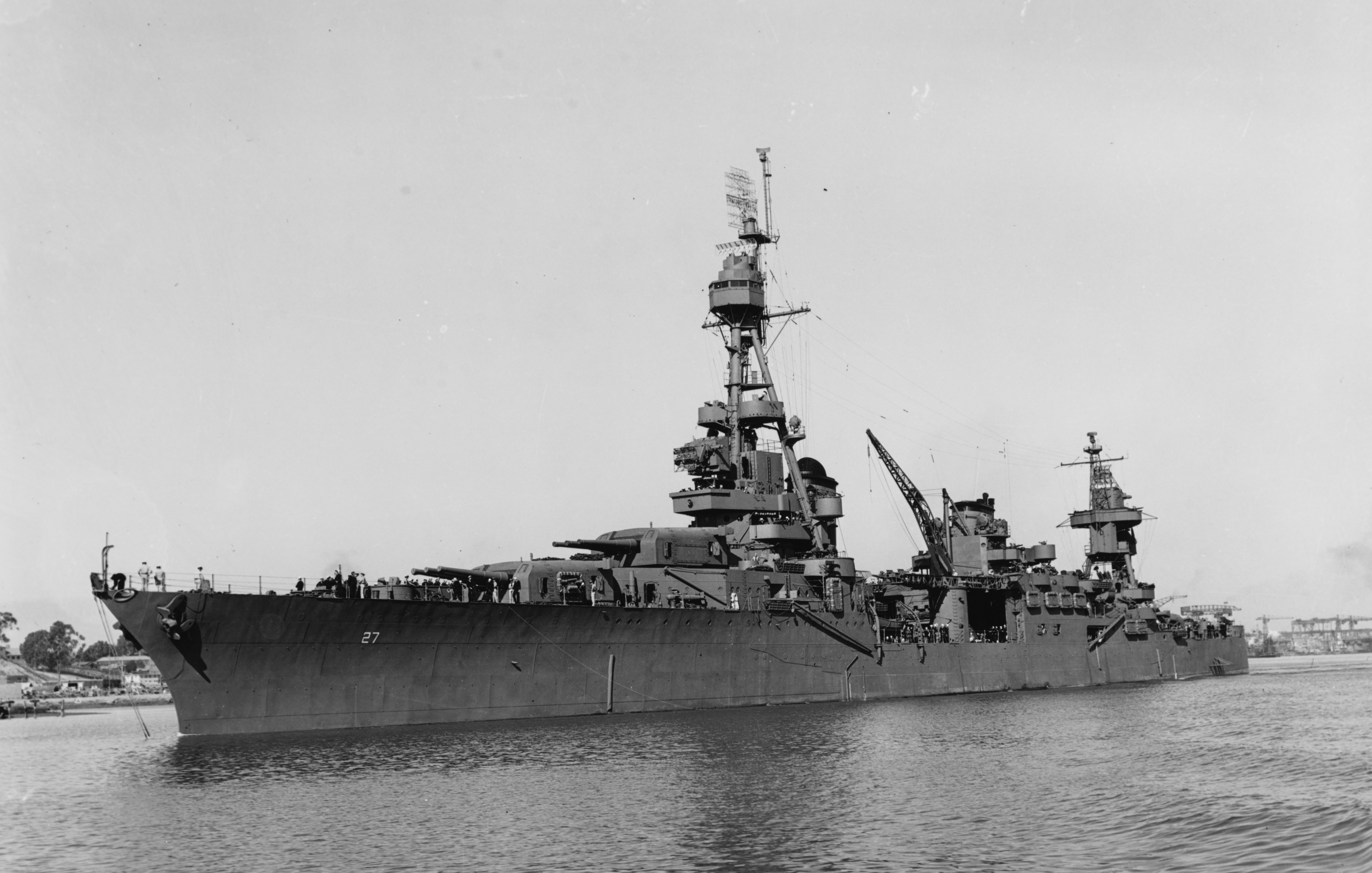
- USS Chester (CA-27), off the Mare Island Navy Yard, Vallejo, California, after torpedo damage repairs and overhaul, 2 October 1943.

History

United States
- Name: Chester
- Namesake: City of Chester, Pennsylvania
- Ordered: 18 December 1924
- Awarded: 13 June 1927
- Builder: New York Shipbuilding Corporation, Camden, New Jersey
- Cost: $10,815,000 (contract price)
- Laid down: 6 March 1928
- Launched: 3 July 1929
- Sponsored by: Miss J. T. Blain
- Commissioned: 24 June 1930
- Decommissioned: 10 June 1946
- Reclassified: CA-27, 1 July 1931
- Stricken: 1 March 1959
- Identification: Hull symbol: CL-27; Hull symbol:CA-27; Code letters: NAFV
- Honors and awards: 11 × battle stars
- Fate: Sold for scrap on 11 August 1959; Scrapped at Panama City, Florida

General characteristics (as built)
- Class & type: Northampton-class cruiser
- Displacement: 9,200 long tons (9,300 t) (standard)
- Length: 600 ft 3 in (182.96 m) oa; 570 ft (170 m) pp
- Beam: 66 ft 1 in (20.14 m)
- Draft: 16 ft 6 in (5.03 m) (mean); 23 ft (7.0 m) (max)
- Installed power: 8 × White-Forster boilers; 107,000 shp (80,000 kW)
- Propulsion: 4 × Parsons reduction steam turbines; 4 × screws
- Speed: 32.7 kn (37.6 mph; 60.6 km/h)
- Range: 10,000 nmi (12,000 mi; 19,000 km) at 15 kn (17 mph; 28 km/h)
- Capacity: 1,500 short tons (1,400 t) fuel oil
- Complement: 92 officers 608 enlisted
- Sensors & processing systems: CXAM radar from 1940
- Armament: 9 × 8 in (203 mm)/55 caliber guns (3x3); 4 × 5 in (127 mm)/25 caliber anti-aircraft guns; 2 × 3-pounder 47 mm (1.9 in) saluting guns; 6 × 21 in (533 mm) torpedo tubes
- Armor: Belt: 3–3 3/4 in (76–95 mm); Deck: 1–2 in (25–51 mm); Barbettes: 1 1/2 in (38 mm); Turrets: 3/4–2 1/2 in (19–64 mm); Conning Tower: 1 1/4 in (32 mm)
- Aircraft carried: 4 × floatplanes (added 1932)
- Aviation facilities: 2 × Amidship catapults (added 1932)

General characteristics (1945)
- Armament: 9 × 8 in (203 mm)/55 caliber guns (3x3); 8 × 5 in (127 mm)/25 caliber anti-aircraft guns; 2 × 3-pounder 47 mm (1.9 in) saluting guns; 7 × quad 40 mm (1.6 in) Bofors guns; 28 × 20 mm (0.79 in) Oerlikon cannons

USS Chester (CL/CA-27), a Northampton-class cruiser, was the second ship of the United States Navy named after the city of Chester, Pennsylvania.

== Construction and commissioning ==
Chester was launched on 3 July 1929 by the New York Shipbuilding Corporation, Camden, New Jersey; sponsored by Miss J. T. Blain; commissioned on 24 June 1930 and reported to the Atlantic Fleet.

== Inter-war period ==
Chester cleared Newport, Rhode Island, on 13 August 1930 for an extensive European cruise. She visited Barcelona, Naples, Constantinople, Phaleron Bay, and Gibraltar before returning to Chester, Pennsylvania, for voyage repairs on 13 October. She joined the Scouting Fleet as flagship for Commander, Light Cruiser Divisions, and on 6 March 1931, embarked the Secretary of the Navy for the Canal Zone where he observed the annual fleet problem from Texas. Chester carried the secretary back to Miami, Fla., arriving on 22 March, then sailed to Narragansett Bay for exercises and duty escorting two visiting French cruisers.

Originally classified as a light cruiser, CL-27, because of her thin armor, Chester was redesignated a heavy cruiser, CA-27, because of her 8-inch guns in accordance with the provisions of the London Naval Treaty of 1930, effective 1 July 1931.

Following an overhaul at New York Navy Yard, Chester stood out of Hampton Roads on 31 July 1932 headed for the West Coast. She arrived at San Pedro, Los Angeles, on 14 August and joined in the regular activities of the fleet. Departing San Pedro on 9 April 1934 as flagship of Commander, Special Service Squadron, she arrived in New York on 31 May for that day's Presidential Naval Review, returning to San Pedro on 9 November. Ensign Richard O'Kane, who would win the Medal of Honor as the most successful United States submarine officer of World War II, served aboard Chester for one year as a junior gun division officer and then as signal officer following graduation from the United States Naval Academy in 1934. On 25 September 1935, Chester embarked the Secretary of War and his party for a voyage to the Philippines in connection with the inauguration of the president of the Philippines Commonwealth on 15 November. Returning to San Francisco on 14 December 1935, she resumed operations with Cruiser Division 4.

Sailing from San Francisco on 28 October 1936, Chester arrived at Charleston, South Carolina, on 13 November and departed five days later to escort Indianapolis with President Franklin Roosevelt embarked for a good-will visit to Buenos Aires, Argentina, and Montevideo, Uruguay. Chester returned to San Pedro on 24 December.

Chester remained on the West Coast for fleet exercises and training cruises to Hawaiian and Alaskan waters from 1937 except for a cruise to the East Coast for exercises and overhaul (23 September 1940 – 21 January 1941). Chester was one of six ships to receive the new RCA CXAM radar in 1940.

Home-ported at Pearl Harbor from 3 February, the cruiser exercised in Hawaiian waters, and made one voyage to the West Coast with Commander, Scouting Force embarked (14 May 1941 – 18 June 1941). From 10 October to 13 November, she escorted two army transports carrying reinforcements to Manila, Philippines Islands. Upon her return, she joined Northampton and Enterprise and was at sea returning from Wake Island when the Japanese attacked Pearl Harbor.

== World War II ==
Chester remained on patrol with Task Force 8 (TF 8) in Hawaiian waters. On 12 December, her planes bombed a submarine, then guided Balch to a depth charge attack which continued until contact was lost.

=== 1942 ===
Chester supported the reinforcement landing on Samoa (18–24 January 1942), then joined Task Group 8.3 (TG 8.3) commanded by Adm. William Halsey for the successful raid on Taroa (1 February). Retiring under heavy air attack, she received a bomb hit in the well deck which killed eight and injured 38. The Chester was the only surface ship to lose men in the first surface attack of the Pacific war. She returned to Pearl Harbor on 3 February for repairs.

Following an escort voyage to San Francisco, Chester joined TF 17 for the Guadalcanal-Tulagi raid (4 May); the attack on Misima Island, Louisiade Archipelago (7 May); and the Battle of the Coral Sea (8 May) during which her steady antiaircraft fire protected the carriers providing the air strikes which stopped the invasion force heading for Port Moresby, New Guinea. Five of Chester's crew were wounded in this encounter. On 10 May, she received 478 survivors of Lexington from Hammann, whom she transferred to Tonga Island on 15 May.

After a West Coast overhaul, Chester arrived at Nouméa on 21 September 1942, to join TF 62 for the landings on Funafuti, Ellice Islands (2–4 October). She then proceeded south and while cruising in support of the operations in the Solomons, specifically north of the New Hebrides Islands, Chester was hit by a torpedo from I-176 on the starboard side, amidships on 20 October which killed 11 and wounded 12. She returned to Espiritu Santo under her own power for emergency repairs on 23 October. Three days later, President Coolidge struck a mine, and Chester sent fire and rescue parties to her aid as well as embarking 440 survivors from the fleet tug Navajo for transfer to Espiritu Santo. She steamed to Sydney, Australia, on 29 October for further repairs and on Christmas Day, departed for Norfolk and a complete overhaul.

=== 1943 ===
Returning to San Francisco on 13 September 1943, Chester operated on escort duty between that port and Pearl Harbor until 20 October. On 8 November, she cleared Pearl Harbor for the invasion of the Gilbert Islands. On 18–20 November, after air attacks, destroyers and cruisers bombarded Tarawa. Chester was the lead ship and received some accurate fire from the beach the first two days. The Chester, along with the rest of the division, also bombarded Apemoma, another of the Gilberts. She covered the landings on Abemama Island and bombarded Taroa, Wotje, and Maloelap.

=== 1944 ===
Chester assumed antisubmarine and antiaircraft patrol off Majuro until 25 April 1944, when she sailed for San Francisco and brief overhaul (6–22 May). She joined TF 94 at Adak Island, Alaska, on 27 May for the bombardments of Matsuwa and Paramushiru in the Kuriles on 13 June and 26 June, then sailed to Pearl Harbor, arriving on 13 August. Captain Henry Hartley assumed command at the time.

Chester sortied on 29 August with TG 12.5 for the bombardment of Wake Island (3 September), then arrived at Eniwetok on 6 September. She cruised off Saipan and participated in the bombardment of Marcus Island on 9 October, before joining TG 38.1 for the carrier strikes on Luzon and Samar in support of the Leyte operations, as well as searching for enemy forces after the Battle for Leyte Gulf (25–26 October).

=== 1945 ===
From 8 November 1944 to 21 February 1945, Chester operated from Ulithi and Saipan in bombardment of Iwo Jima and the Bonins, supporting the invasion landings of 19 February.

After another West Coast overhaul, Chester returned to Ulithi on 21 June, and conducted patrols off Okinawa from 27 June, as well as covering minesweeping operations west of the island. In late July, Chester was assigned to the force supplying air cover for the Coast Striking Group (TG 95.2) off the Yangtze River Delta and protecting minesweeping. In August, she made a voyage to the Aleutians, and on the last day of the month sailed to participate in the occupation landings at Ominato, Aomori, Hakodate, and Otaru in September and October.

== Post-war ==
Chester embarked homeward bound troops at Iwo Jima, and sailed on 2 November for San Francisco, arriving on 18 November. She made another voyage to Guam to bring home servicemen (24 November – 17 December), then steamed on 14 January 1946 for Philadelphia, arriving on 30 January.

Chester was placed out of commission in reserve in Philadelphia on 10 June. She was sold for scrap on 11 August 1959.

== Awards ==
Chester received 11 battle stars for World War II service.

== Gallery ==
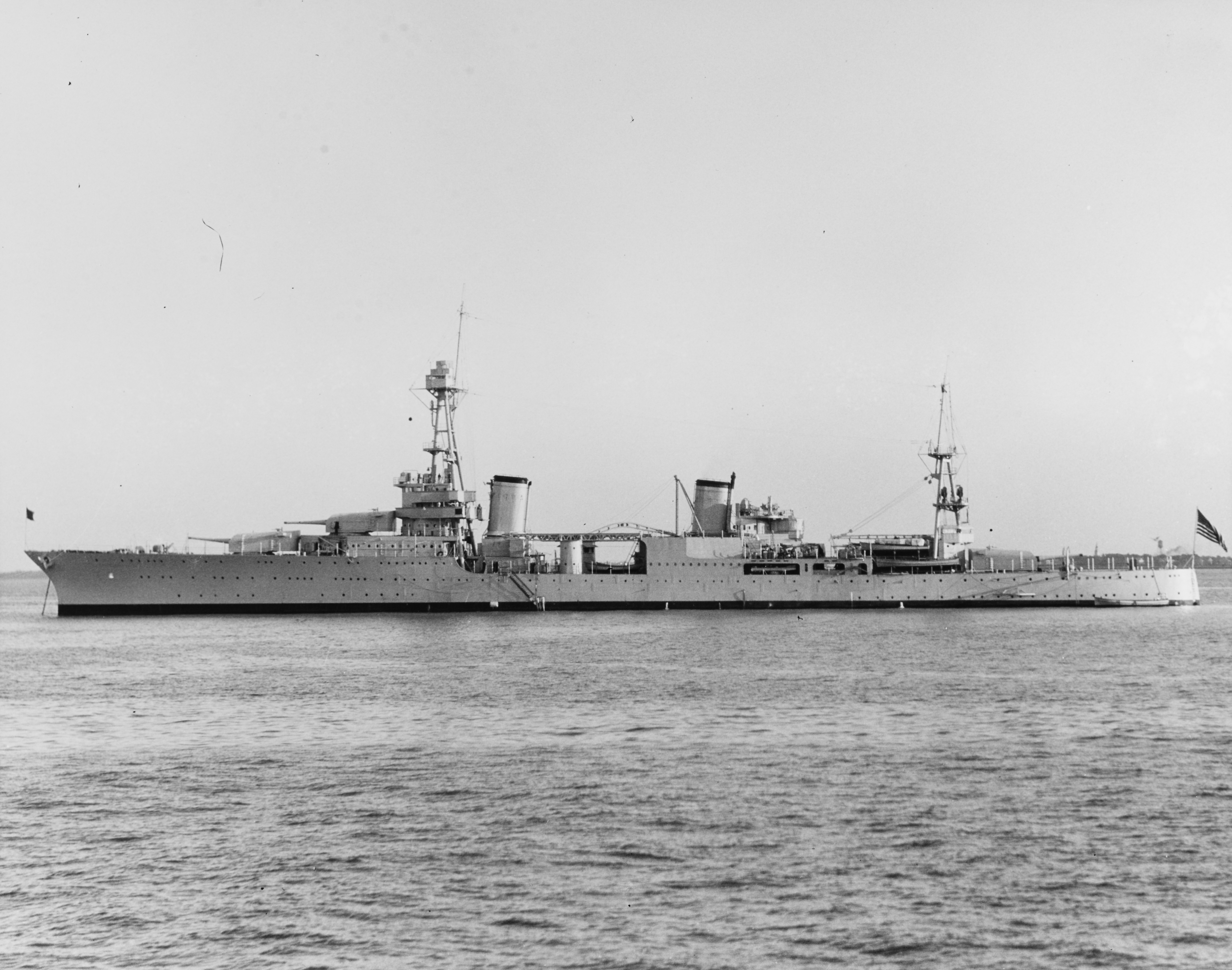
Chester as completed, 1930

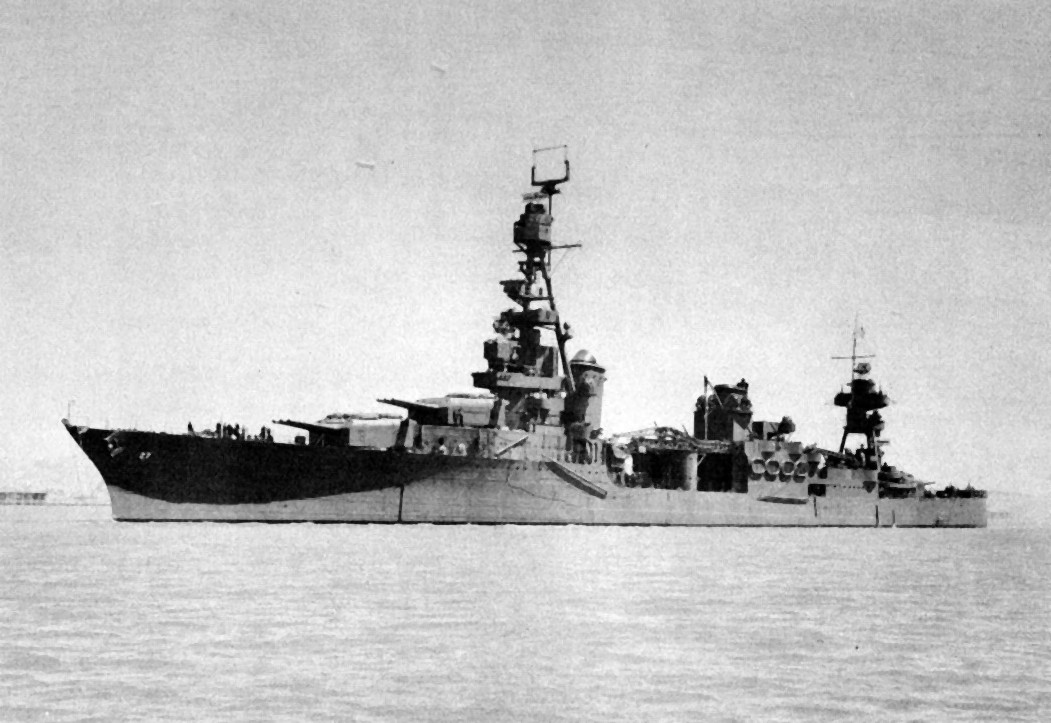
Chester in August 1942

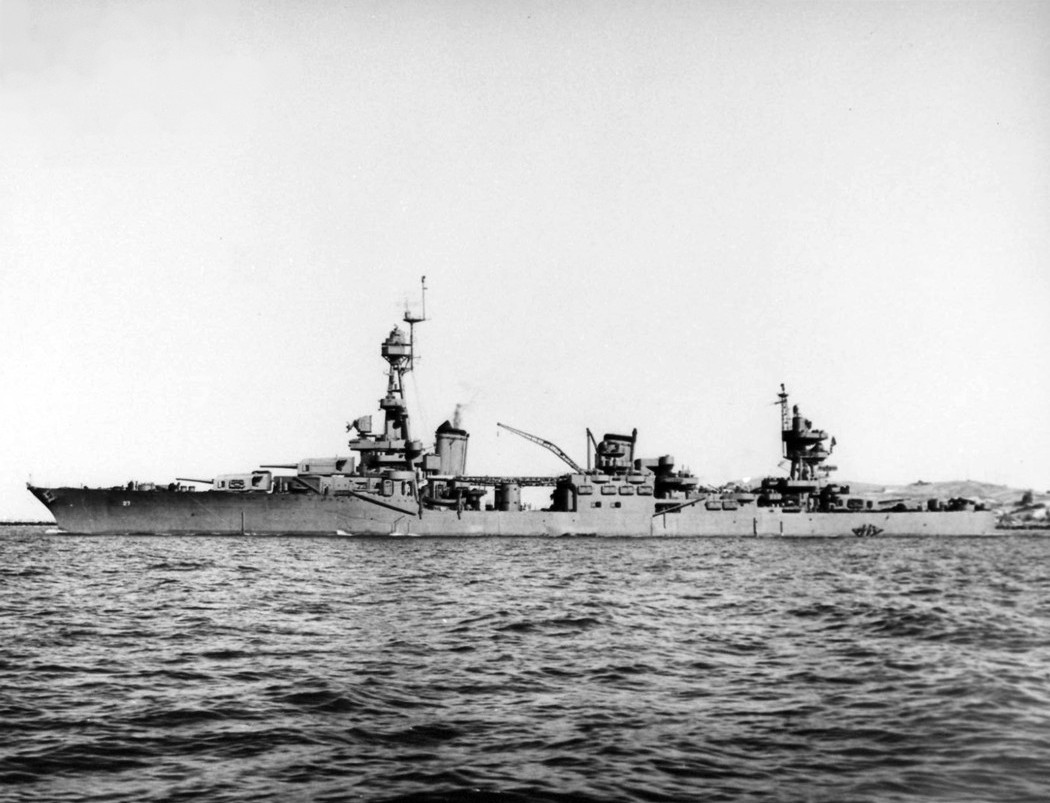
Chester in October 1943 after repair of her torpedo damage

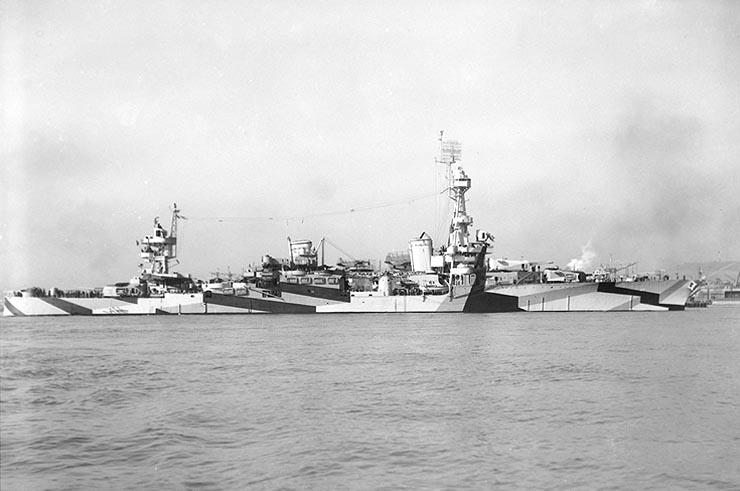
Chester with camouflage measure 32, design 9d, 1944

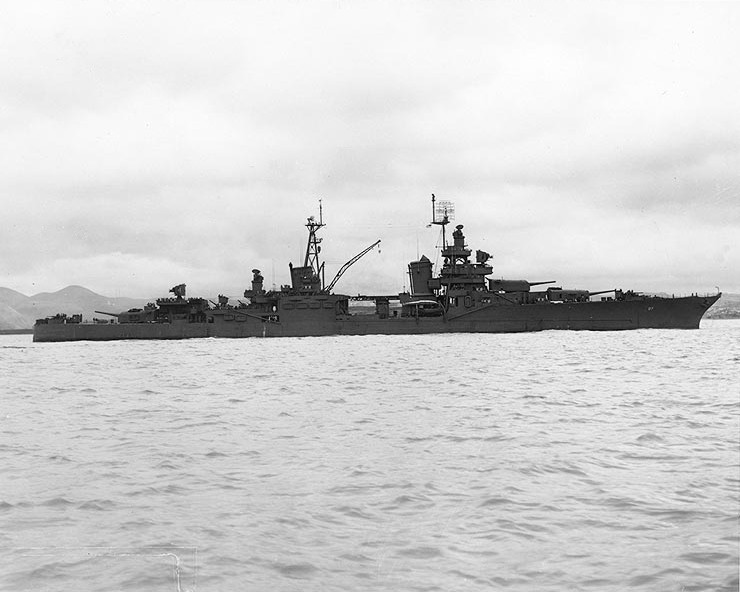
The foremast was cut down and reduced to save top weight, and the mainmast was moved forward and mounted around the aft smoke stack in 1945

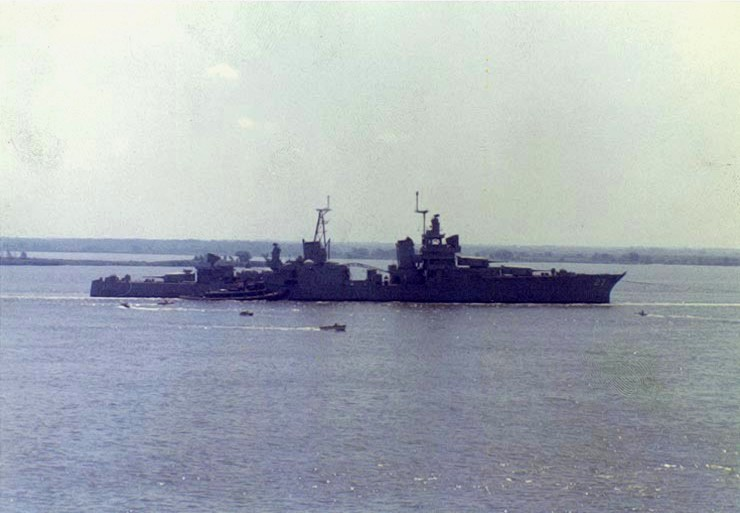
On the way to the breaker's yard, 1959

== Bibliography ==
- Jane's Fighting Ships of World War II. Studio. 1989. ISBN 1-85170-194-X.
- Fahey, James C. (1941). The Ships and Aircraft of the U.S. Fleet, Two-Ocean Fleet Edition. Ships and Aircraft.
- Silverstone, Paul H (1965). US Warships of World War II. Annapolis, Maryland: Naval Institute Press. ISBN 0-87021-773-9.
- Wright, Christopher C. (September 2019). "Question 7/56: Concerning What Radar Systems Were Installed on U.S. Asiatic Fleet Ships in December 1941". Warship International. LVI (3): 192–198. ISSN 0043-0374.
