= USS Susan B. Anthony =

Troop ship of WW2 sunk off Normandy

Coordinates: 49°29′24″N 0°42′48″W

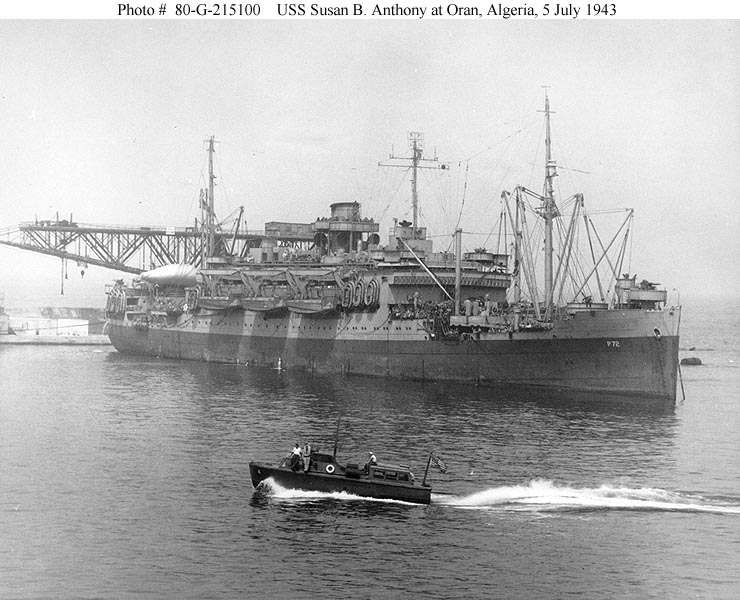
- Susan B. Anthony at Oran, 5 July 1943

History

United States
- Name: SS Santa Clara (1930–1942); USS Susan B. Anthony (1942–1944)
- Namesake: Susan B. Anthony
- Owner: Grace Steamship Company
- Operator: Grace Steamship Co (1930–1942); United States Navy (1942–1944)
- Port of registry: New York
- Builder: New York Shipbuilding Corporation, Camden, New Jersey
- Launched: March 1930, as SS Santa Clara
- Acquired: chartered 7 August 1942
- Commissioned: 7 September 1942, as USS Susan B. Anthony
- Out of service: 7 June 1944
- Stricken: 29 July 1944
- Home port: New York
- Identification: official number 229337; code letters MHRC (until 1933); Call sign WDMB (from 1934)
- Honors and awards: 3 service stars (World War II)
- Fate: mined 7 June 1944

General characteristics
- Type: ocean liner (1930–42); transport ship (1942–44)
- Tonnage: 8,220 GRT; tonnage under deck 5,440; 8,825 NRT
- Displacement: 16,000 long tons (16,257 t)
- Length: 504 ft 8 in (153.8 m) LOA; 483.3 ft (147.3 m)
- Beam: 63 ft 9 in (19.4 m)
- Draft: 25 ft (7.6 m)
- Depth: 34.4 ft (10.5 m)
- Installed power: 2,660 NHP
- Propulsion: turbo-electric transmission; twin screw
- Speed: 18 kn (33 km/h)
- Complement: 158 officers and men
- Armament: 1 × 5 in (130 mm)/38 cal dual purpose gun; 4 × 3 in (76 mm)/50 cal anti-aircraft guns

USS Susan B. Anthony (AP-72) was a turbo-electric ocean liner, of the Grace Steamship Company that was built in 1930 under the original name Santa Clara.

During World War II, Santa Clara was turned over to the War Shipping Administration (WSA) on 28 February 1942 to be operated by Grace Lines as a troop ship making voyages to the South Pacific. Later that year, the ship was repurposed for operation as a transport ship when it was chartered to the United States Navy, who renamed it after women's rights activist Susan B. Anthony. On 7 June 1944, the ship was sunk by a mine off the coast of Normandy while transporting troops on its way to Utah Beach as part of the Allied invasion of Normandy in Operation Overlord. All 2,689 people aboard were saved.

== Building and civilian service ==
The New York Shipbuilding Corporation of Camden, New Jersey completed the ship in March 1930 and named her the SS Santa Clara.

Santa Clara had six water tube boilers with a combined heating surface of 28,800 square feet (2,680 m^{2}) and a working pressure of 300 lb_{f}/in^{2}. Santa Clara was turbo-electric: her boilers supplied steam to two turbo generators which fed current to electric motors connected to her twin propeller shafts. General Electric made her turbo generators and propulsion motors, and her power output was rated at 2,660 NHP.

Santa Clara gave more than a decade of civilian service. Notable passengers included Walt Disney and his staff in 1941 who had been in Chile researching their film The Three Caballeros. They left Valparaíso on the Santa Clara on 4 October and reached New York on 20 October.

== World War II ==
On 28 February 1942 Santa Clara was delivered at New York to the War Shipping Administration (WSA) by Grace Lines with that line operating the ship as a WSA transport allocated to Army transportation requirements under a general agency agreement. On 11 March the agreement terms were changed to bareboat charter by WSA.

=== WSA troopship ===
The ship was converted from commercial configuration by Robins Dry Dock and Repair Company in New York in late February. During this period Santa Clara is shown as being in the Pacific and in at least one large convoy, BT-201, departing New York on 4 March and arriving Brisbane on 6 April 1942. During that voyage the ship had stopped at Bora Bora on the way to Australia and Melbourne, Townsville and Wellington before returning to San Francisco on 11 May 1942. Santa Clara returned to the South Pacific departing San Francisco on 26 May destined for Auckland and Bora Bora before crossing the Pacific to Buenaventura, Colombia and then transiting the Panama Canal on 9 July bound for New York. On 7 August 1942 Santa Clara was delivered to the Navy at New York on a sub bareboat charter basis.

=== Navy service ===
After delivery to the Navy Bethlehem Shipbuilding Corporation's New York yard converted Santa Clara for Navy troop transport service. The Navy renamed the ship after the women's suffrage and women's rights campaigner Susan B. Anthony, making her one of the few Naval vessels named after a woman. She was commissioned on 7 September 1942 as USS Susan B. Anthony, with the designation AP-72, under the command of Captain Henry Hartley.

==== Invasion of North Africa, 1942 ====
After almost a month of drills and exercises in the lower Chesapeake Bay, the transport — carrying troops and equipment — left the bay on 23 October for Operation Torch, the Allied invasion of North Africa. At the end of a 15-day crossing, she reached the transport area off Mehdia, French Morocco. Early the next morning, on 8 November, the Northern Attack Group opened the assault on Mehdia and Port Lyautey. Despite the general difficulties encountered in handling landing craft, she disembarked her troops and unloaded their equipment in relatively good order. She stayed in the area for a week before sailing on the 15th for Safi, Morocco to unload the rest of her cargo. On 18 November she left Safi for Norfolk, Virginia, and arrived at Hampton Roads on the last day of the month.

Over the next seven months Susan B. Anthony made three voyages bringing troops and supplies across the Atlantic to North Africa; the first to Casablanca and the remainder to Oran, Algeria.

==== Invasion of Sicily, 1943 ====
After a brief voyage to the Gulf of Arzeu ferrying men and equipment, she returned to Oran on 25 June 1943 to prepare for the Allied invasion of Sicily. She embarked men and loaded material on 30 June-1 July, refueled on the 2nd, and left Oran three days later.

Anthony approached the coast of Sicily on the 9th near the town of Scoglitti. She spent the early hours of the next day landing troops and equipment. By 0435 hrs enemy aircraft were attacking the ships of the assault force. Bombs fell close to Anthony but she emerged with only minor damage from bomb fragments. Just before 0600 hrs she started toward the inshore anchorage, but withdrew after shore batteries fired on her. About four hours later she was able to enter the anchorage and send her salvage crew to aid broached and disabled landing craft.

Through that day and the next she came under repeated air attacks. Just after 2200 hrs on the 11th a twin-engine plane commenced an attack run at her, but by the time it had closed within 1,500 yd (1,400 m), her anti-aircraft guns had shot it down in flames. Less than 10 minutes later another enemy bomber met a similar fate.

Late in the afternoon of 12 July Susan B. Anthony left for Oran. There she loaded prisoners; sailed for the US; and reached New York on 3 August 1943.

==== Atlantic convoys, 1943–44 ====
For the next 10 months Anthony crossed and recrossed the Atlantic moving soldiers and cargo between various ports in the US, England, Iceland, Northern Ireland and Scotland in preparation for Operation Overlord, the cross-channel invasion of Europe at Normandy; one of these voyages included Her participating in the fast convoy UT-3 leaving New York Harbor 08 October 1943 and arriving in North Ireland 17 October 1943. On these voyages she visited ports including Belfast, Northern Ireland; Holy Loch, Gourock, and Glasgow in Scotland; Hvalfjörður and Reykjavík, Iceland; Mumbles and Milford Haven in Wales, and Newport.

==== Sinking off Normandy, 7 June 1944 ====
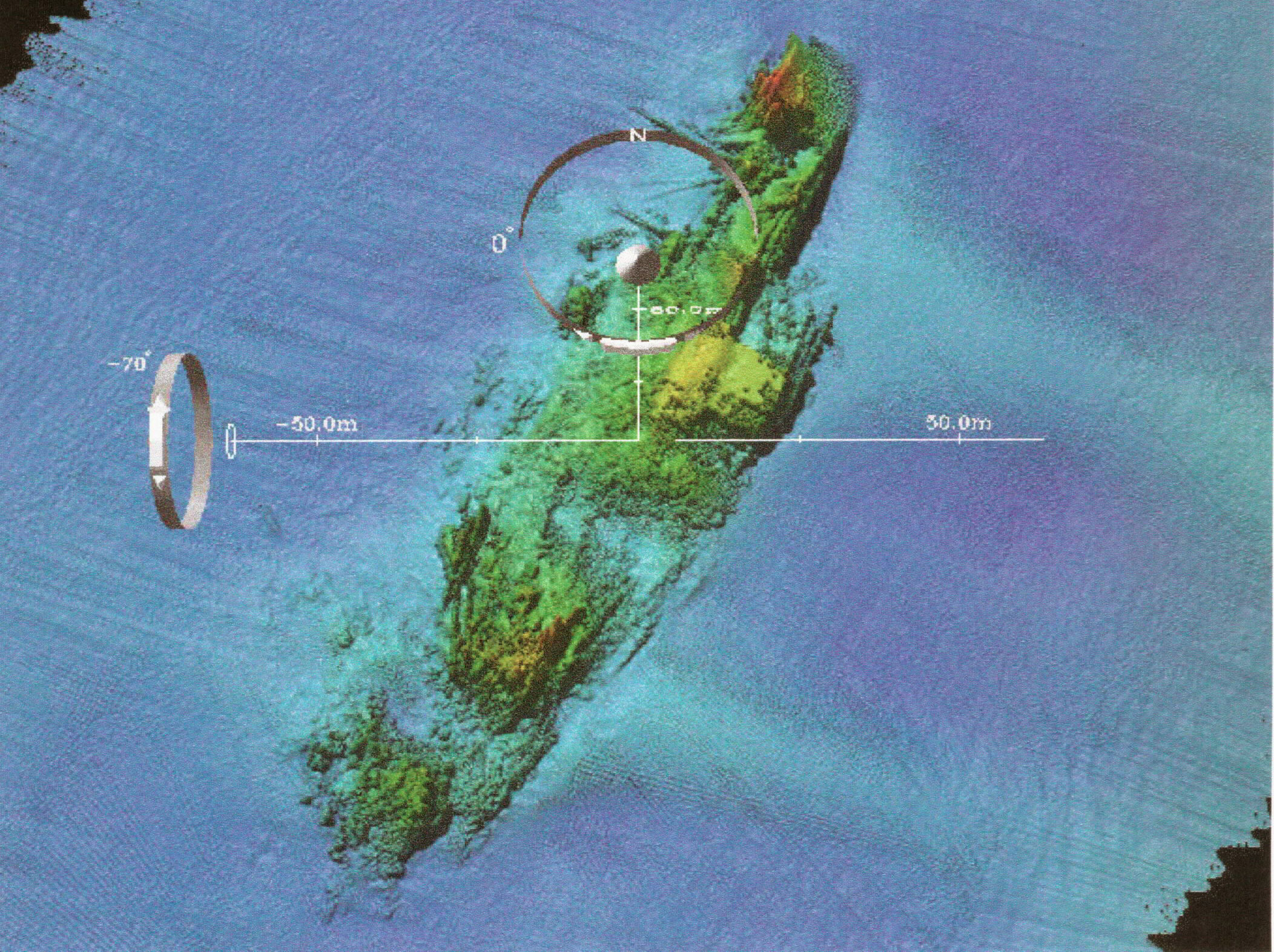
A multibeam image of the wreck in 2003

Early in the morning of 7 June 1944, while transporting soldiers of the 90th Infantry Division through a swept channel off Normandy en route to Utah Beach, Susan B. Anthony struck a mine that exploded under her number 4 hold. Immediately she lost all power, and her rudder went hard left and stuck. By 08:05 holds numbers 4 and 5 were shipping water badly, and the ship took on an 8° list to starboard. In an effort to save his ship, the commanding officer, Commander TL Gray, USNR, ordered the embarked soldiers to move to the port side. This human ballast soon brought Anthony back to an even keel.

At 08:22 fleet tug USS Pinto came alongside, prepared to tow the paralyzed Anthony to shallow water. However, fires soon erupted in her engine and fire rooms, and she began to settle more rapidly. The captain now concluded that the ship was lost and ordered her abandoned. With Pinto and two destroyers alongside, the troops were evacuated expeditiously, without resorting to lifeboats or rafts, using cargo nets bridged to the adjacent ships. Anthony's crew followed closely behind the soldiers. By 09:05 the main deck was awash at the stern and she was listing badly. The last member of the salvage crew hit the water at about 10:00 with Commander Gray soon following.

At 10:10 Susan B. Anthony sank about 10 miles (16 km) from the French coast at a depth of 70 feet (21 m). No one was killed, and few of the 45 wounded were seriously hurt. All 2,689 people aboard were saved, which the Guinness Book of World Records lists as the largest rescue of people without loss of life. Samuel Tankersley Williams, then a brigadier general serving as assistant division commander of the 90th Infantry Division, received the Soldier's Medal for non-combat heroism in recognition of his efforts to evacuate the ship. Even though he didn't know how to swim, Williams personally braved smoke, heat, and flames to search the ship and ensure that no one was left behind. Susan B. Anthony was struck from the Naval Vessel Register on 29 July 1944.

==== Honors ====
Susan B. Anthony was awarded three service stars for World War II service.

== Bibliography ==
- Arnold Hague Convoy Database. "Convoy BT.201". CONVOYWEB.
- Charles, Roland W. (1947). Troopships of World War II (PDF). Washington: The Army Transportation Association. LCCN 47004779. Archived from the original (PDF) on 30 October 2020.
- Grover, David (1987). U.S. Army Ships and Watercraft of World War II. Naval Institute Press. ISBN 0-87021-766-6. LCCN 87015514.
- Maritime Administration. "Santa Clara". Ship History Database Vessel Status Card. U.S. Department of Transportation, Maritime Administration. Archived from the original on 4 March 2016.
- Naval History And Heritage Command. "Susan B. Anthony (as of 22 May 2015: Susan B.)". Dictionary of American Naval Fighting Ships. Naval History And Heritage Command.
- "New Grace Liner Santa Clara". Pacific Marine Review. 27 (May). San Francisco: J.S. Hines: 184–186. 1930.
