= USS S-4 =

S-class submarine of the United States

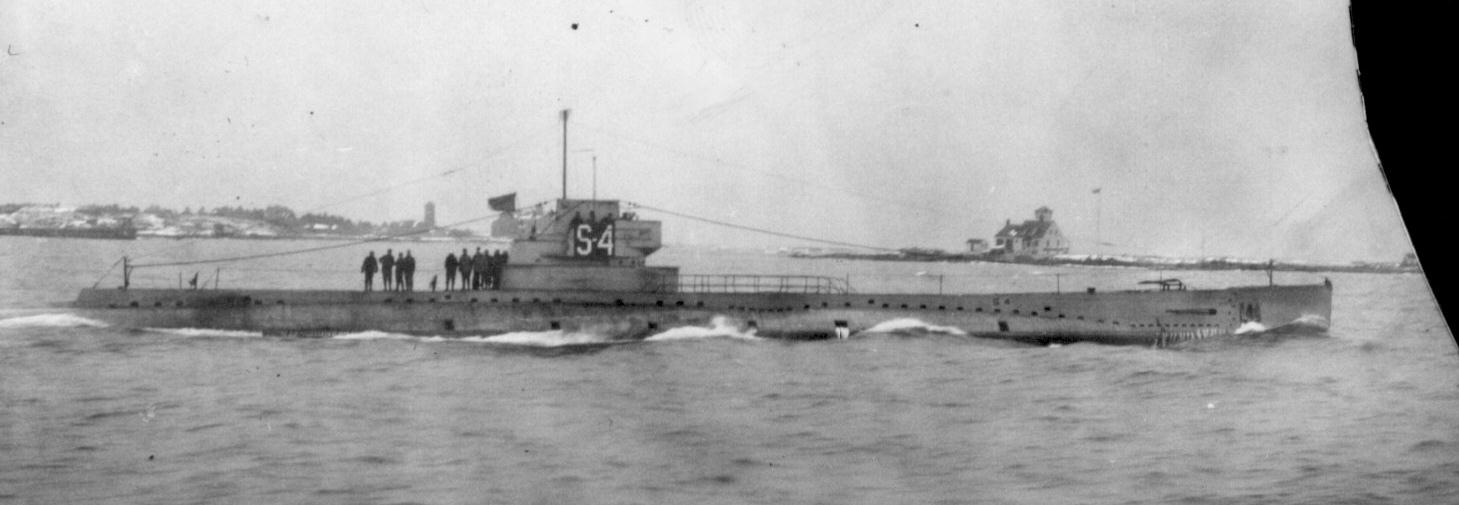
- USS S-4 underway off the Portsmouth Navy Yard, on 26 December 1919

History

United States
- Name: S-4
- Builder: Portsmouth Navy Yard, on Seavey Island, Kittery, Maine
- Cost: $677,284.21 (hull and machinery)
- Laid down: 4 December 1917
- Launched: 27 August 1919
- Sponsored by: Mrs. Mary Howard
- Commissioned: 19 November 1919
- Decommissioned: 19 March 1928
- Recommissioned: 16 October 1928
- Decommissioned: 7 April 1933
- Stricken: 15 January 1936
- Identification: Hull symbol: SS-109 (17 July 1920); Call sign: NIML
- Fate: Destroyed by sinking, 15 May 1936

General characteristics
- Class & type: S-3-class submarine
- Displacement: 875 long tons (889 t) surfaced; 1,088 long tons (1,105 t) submerged
- Length: 231 feet (70 m)
- Beam: 21 ft 10 in (6.65 m)
- Draft: 13 ft 1 in (3.99 m)
- Installed power: 1,400 brake horsepower (1,044 kW) diesel; 1,200 hp (895 kW) electric
- Propulsion: 2 × NELSECO diesel engines; 2 × Westinghouse Electric Corporation electric motors; 1 × 120-cell batteries; 2 × propellers
- Speed: 15 knots (28 km/h; 17 mph) surfaced; 11 kn (20 km/h; 13 mph) submerged
- Test depth: 200 ft (61 m)
- Capacity: 36,950 US gallons (139,900 L; 30,770 imp gal) fuel
- Complement: 4 officers; 34 enlisted
- Armament: 4 × 21-inch (533 mm) torpedo tubes (12 torpedoes); 1 × 4-inch (102 mm)/50-caliber

USS S-4 (SS-109), also known as "Submarine No. 109", was an S-3-class, also referred to as a "Government"-type, submarine of the United States Navy.

In 1927, S-4 was sunk by the accidental ramming by the United States Coast Guard destroyer Paulding, with the loss of all hands, she was raised and restored to service, until being decommissioned in 1933.

== Design ==
The "Government"-type had a length of 231 feet (70.4 m) overall, a beam of 21 ft 10 in (6.7 m), and a mean draft of 13 ft 1 in (4.0 m). They displaced 875 long tons (889 t) on the surface and 1,088 long tons (1,105 t) submerged. All S-class submarines had a crew of 4 officers and 34 enlisted men, when first commissioned. They had a diving depth of 200 ft (61.0 m).

For surface running, the S-3-class were powered by two 700-brake-horsepower (522 kW) NELSECO diesel engines, each driving one propeller shaft. When submerged each propeller was driven by a 600-horsepower (447 kW) Westinghouse Electric Corporation electric motor. They could reach 15 knots (28 km/h; 17 mph) on the surface and 11 kn (20 km/h; 13 mph) underwater.

The boats were armed with four 21-inch (533 mm) torpedo tubes in the bow. They carried eight reloads, for a total of twelve torpedoes. The S-3-class submarines were also armed with a single 4 in (100 mm)/50 caliber deck gun.

== Construction ==
S-4's keel was laid down on 4 December 1917, by the Portsmouth Navy Yard, in Kittery, Maine. She was launched on 27 August 1919, sponsored by Mrs. Mary Howard, and commissioned on 19 November 1919.

== Service history ==
Following acceptance trials, a visit to Havana, Cuba, from 14 to 19 January 1920, and subsequent operations along the Gulf of Mexico and New England coasts.

When the US Navy adopted its hull classification system on 17 July 1920, she received the hull number SS-109.

S-4 departed New London, Connecticut, on 18 November 1921, to rendezvous off New Hampshire, with her assigned unit, Submarine Divisions 12 (SubDiv 12), and SubDiv 18. The two divisions were about to embark on a historic voyage which, at that time, was to be the longest cruise undertaken by American submarines. Assigned to Submarine Flotilla 3, of the Asiatic Fleet, at Cavite, in the Philippine Islands, they sailed via the Panama Canal and Pearl Harbor, and arrived at Cavite, on 1 December 1921.

S-4 operated out of the Cavite Naval Station, with occasional visits to Chinese ports, until late 1924, when the two divisions were reassigned to the West Coast. Departing Cavite, on 29 October, they arrived at Mare Island, California, on 30 December.

Remaining at Mare Island, in 1925, she operated along the West Coast, through 1926, mainly at San Francisco, San Pedro Submarine Base-San Pedro, and San Diego, California. She departed Mare Island, on 10 February 1927, and sailed to the Panama Canal Zone, where she operated through March–April, then proceeded to New London, Connecticut, arriving on 3 May. For the remainder of the year, she operated off the New England coast.

=== Sinking ===
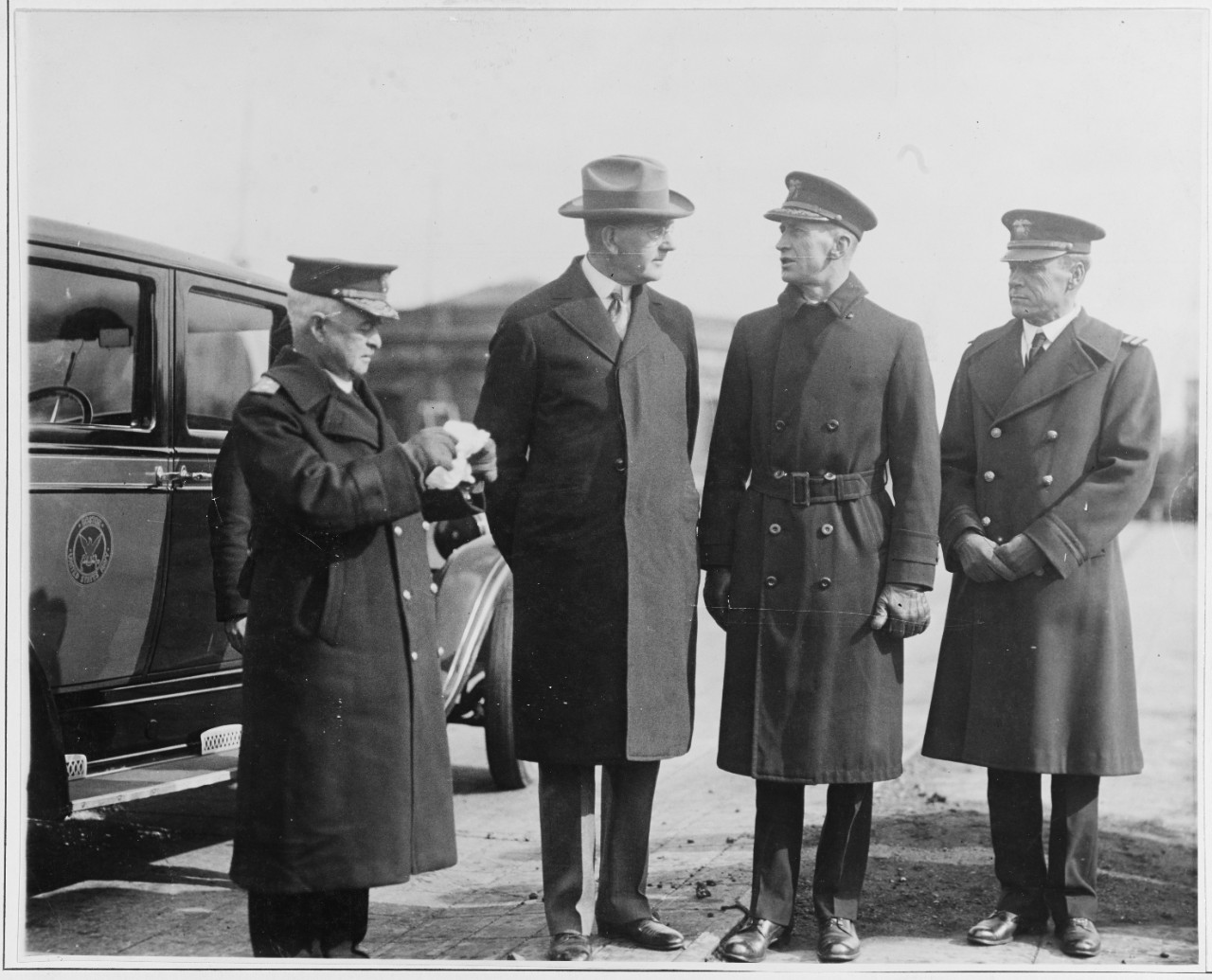
Secretary of the Navy Curtis D. Wilbur (2nd from left) during salvage work of S-4, in March 1928. Captain Ernest King and Lieutenant Henry Hartley, in charge of salvage operation (first and second from right) while Rear Admiral Philip Andrews (left) looks on.

On 17 December 1927, S4 was engaged in a series of test dives following an extended overhaul. No information had been disseminated by the Navy to indicate that she was engaged in test dives. Further, S4 was alone, unaccompanied by the tender which had been assigned to warn passing ships of the numerous dive/re-surface evolutions of S4. The tender, a minesweeper, was "sheltering" inside Provincetown harbor. While surfacing from a submerged run over the measured-mile off Provincetown, Massachusetts, she was accidentally rammed and sunk by the United States Coast Guard destroyer Paulding on Rum Patrol. The sinking was reported to be at a depth of 90 to 100 ft (27 to 30 m) located 1,800 yards (1.0 mi; 1.6 km) off the Wood End Coast Guard Station, which was located near Wood End Light. Paulding stopped and lowered lifeboats, but found only a small amount of oil and air bubbles.

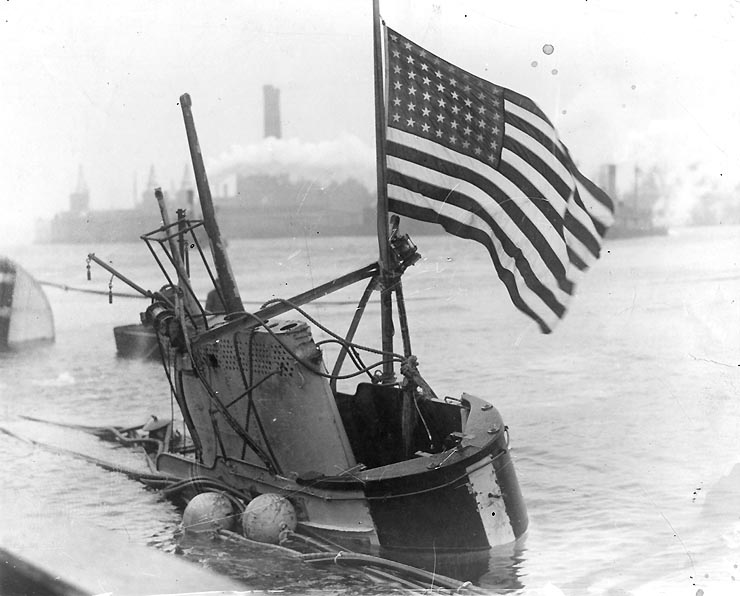
S-4 under tow to the Boston Navy Yard, after being salvaged in 1928

Rescue and salvage operations were commenced led by Rear Admiral Frank H. Brumby, Captain Ernest J. King, Lieutenant Henry Hartley and Commander Edward Ellsberg, only to be thwarted by severe weather. Significant effort was made to rescue six known survivors trapped in the forward torpedo room, who had exchanged a series of signals with the rescue force, by tapping on the hull. As the trapped men used the last of available oxygen in the sub, they sent a morse-coded message, "Is there any hope?” The response, composed by Captain King was: "There is hope. Everything possible is being done." Thwarted by the weather, the rescue force could not rescue the six men, and all 40 men aboard were lost.

During the course of the rescue operation, Chief Gunner's Mate Thomas Eadie, rescued at the risk of his own life, a fellow diver, Fred Michels, who became fouled in the wreckage while attempting to attach an air hose to S-4. For his heroism, Eadie was awarded the Medal of Honor.

S-4 was raised on 17 March 1928, the submarine was towed to the Boston Navy Yard for dry-docking and was decommissioned on 19 March 1928. The salvage operation was commanded by Captain King. Several of the salvage divers, including Eadie, and previous Medal of Honor recipient Frank W. Crilley, were awarded the Navy Cross for their actions during the operation. Another Medal of Honor recipient, Chief Boatswain George Cregan, received the Navy Cross for his service as commander of the tugboat Sagamore during the rescue attempt.

== Recommissioning ==
S-4 was recommissioned on 16 October 1928, after repairs and conversion to a test vessel for submarine rescue experimentation. She served at Key West, Florida, early in 1929–1930, and in the Northeastern United States during the remainder of those years. In 1931, she operated again at New London, until departing there on 3 January 1932, for Pearl Harbor. Sailing via the Panama Canal, she arrived at Pearl Harbor on 29 August 1932.

== Fate ==
On 7 April 1933, S-4 was decommissioned and laid up. She was stricken from the Naval Vessel Register on 15 January 1936, and scuttled on 15 May 1936.

== See also ==
- List of disasters in Massachusetts by death toll

== Bibliography ==
- "Table 21 - Ships on Navy List June 30, 1919". Congressional Serial Set. U.S. Government Printing Office: 770. 1921.
- Friedman, Norman (1995). U.S. Submarines Through 1945: An Illustrated Design History. Annapolis, Maryland: Naval Institute Press. ISBN 1-55750-263-3.
- Priolo, Gary. "S-4 (SS-109)". Navsource.net.
- Hall, Anne Martin (1925). Ships of the United States navy and their sponsors, 1913-1923.
- "S-4". Dictionary of American Naval Fighting Ships. Navy Department, Naval History and Heritage Command. 1 September 2015. This article incorporates text from this source, which is in the public domain.
- "Submarine Casualties Booklet". U.S. Naval Submarine School. 1966. Archived from the original on 11 September 2009.
- "U.S. Sub, 43 Aboard, Goes Down In Crash". Decatur Daily Review. Decatur, Illinois. AP. 18 December 1927. p. 1 – via newspapers.com.
- "Station Wood End, Massachusetts". history.uscg.mil.
- Williams, Joseph A. (2015). Seventeen fathoms deep: The saga of the submarine S-4 disaster. Chicago, IL: Chicago Review Press. p. 169.
- "Navy Sinks Jinx Submarine". Vol. 42. San Bernardino, California: The San Bernardino Daily Sun. 26 May 1936. p. 2.
