= USS Falcon (AM-28) =

Minesweeper of the United States Navy

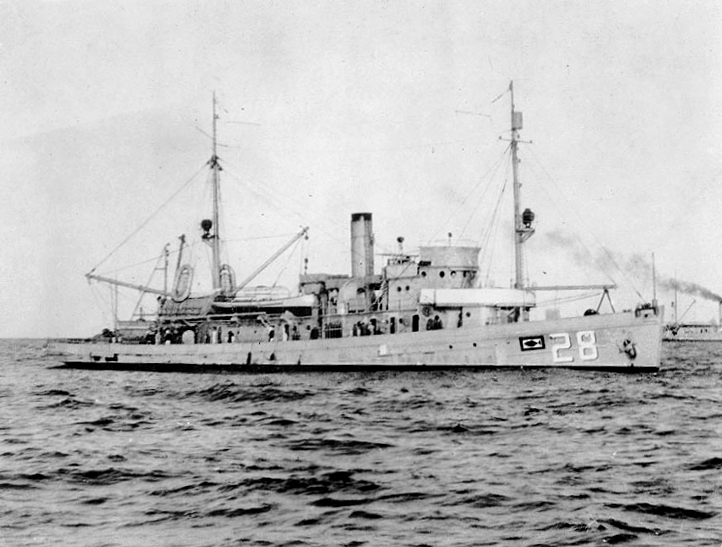
- USS Falcon (ASR-2) at sea c1920s

History

United States
- Name: USS Falcon
- Builder: Gas Engine and Power Co., and C. L. Seabury Co., Morris Heights, New York
- Launched: 7 September 1918
- Commissioned: 12 November 1918, as Minesweeper No.28
- Decommissioned: 18 June 1946
- Reclassified: AM-28, 17 July 1920; ASR-2, 12 September 1929
- Fate: Sold, 12 March 1947

General characteristics
- Class & type: Lapwing-class minesweeper
- Displacement: 950 long tons (965 t)
- Length: 187 ft 10 in (57.25 m)
- Beam: 35 ft 6 in (10.82 m)
- Draft: 12 ft 7 in (3.84 m)
- Speed: 14 knots (26 km/h; 16 mph)
- Armament: 2 × 3 in (76 mm) guns

The third USS Falcon, (AM-28/ASR-2) was a Lapwing-class minesweeper in the United States Navy. She later became a submarine rescue ship.

== Construction and commissioning ==
Falcon was launched 7 September 1918 by Gas Engine and Power Co., and C. L. Seabury Co., Morris Heights, New York; sponsored by Mrs. W. J. Parslow; and commissioned 12 November 1918. She was reclassified ASR-2 on 12 September 1929.

== Service history ==
=== North Atlantic operations ===
Originally commanded by Sam Trohman, from December 1918 to May 1919, Falcon served on temporary duty in the 4th Naval District as a lightship. After towing targets and various craft along the U.S. East Coast, an occupation with salvage duty which was to be her major employment for many years, she sailed from New York on 8 August 1919 for Kirkwall, Orkney Islands, Scotland. For two months she aided in clearing the North Sea of the vast number of mines laid there in the North Sea Mine Barrage of World War I, returning to Charleston, South Carolina, 28 November 1919.

Falcon made a second voyage to European waters between March and August 1920, visiting Rosyth, Scotland, and Brest, France, and returning by way of the Azores with a captured German submarine in tow for the Panama Canal Zone. Back at Hampton Roads 18 October 1920, she returned to towing, salvage, and transport duty along the east coast. After conducting salvage operations on USS S-5 through the summer of 1921, she was assigned permanently to submarine salvage work, based at New London, Connecticut. On 14 August 1922 Falcon recovered the German U-boat U-111 off the Virginia coast, brought her to a dry dock at Norfolk Navy Yard, towed her back out to sea on 30 August 1922, and finally sank U-111 with a depth charge on 31 August 1922. She continued to perform occasional towing duty, and from time to time sailed to the Caribbean on both salvage and towing duty.

=== Salvage operations ===
In 1925, Falcon joined the Control Force for operations in the Panama Canal Zone, along the United States West Coast, and in the Hawaiian Islands. She returned to home waters in September, and began her part in the salvage operations on USS S-51 under Lieutenant Henry Hartley in which she joined that fall and the next spring. After the submarine was raised through determined and ingenious efforts, it was Falcon who towed her to New York in July 1926, providing air pressure for the pontoons supporting the submarine, as well as her compartments.

Acting as tender as well as salvage ship for submarines, Falcon accompanied them to fleet exercises in waters from Maine to the Panama Canal Zone, and conducted many operations to develop rescue techniques, as well as training divers. She stood by during deep submergence runs and other tests of new submarines, and played an important role in rescuing sailors from USS Squalus in late May of 1939, and in the rescue operations on USS O-9 in June 1941.

=== World War II operations ===
Throughout World War II, Falcon sailed out of New London, Connecticut and Portsmouth, New Hampshire, on salvage, towing, and experimental operations. When at New London, she usually served as flagship for Commander, Submarine Force, Atlantic Fleet. Her only deployment from New England waters during the war came between July and October 1943, when she conducted diving operations and laid moorings in the anchorage at Argentia, Newfoundland. One of her most important activities during the war was training divers, search, salvage, and rescue workers to man newer submarine rescue ships.

== Decommissioning and disposal ==
Falcon was decommissioned at Boston, Massachusetts, on 18 June 1946. She was sold on 12 March 1947.

== Motion picture roles ==
Falcon portrayed a rescue ship in the 1937 movie Submarine D-1, starring Pat O'Brien and George Brent.

Footage of Falcon appears in the 1953 science fiction giant monster film The Beast from 20,000 Fathoms.

== Awards ==
- American Defense Service Medal
- American Campaign Medal
- World War Two Victory Medal
