= USS S-51 =

S-class submarine of the United States Navy

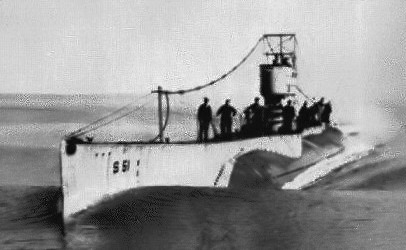
- USS S-51

History

United States
- Name: USS S-51
- Builder: Lake Torpedo Boat Company
- Laid down: 22 December 1919
- Launched: 20 August 1921
- Commissioned: 24 June 1922
- Stricken: 27 January 1930
- Fate: Sunk in accident, 25 September 1925.; Sold for scrap after being raised, 23 June 1930.

General characteristics
- Class & type: S-class submarine
- Displacement: 993 long tons (1,009 t) surfaced; 1,230 long tons (1,250 t) submerged
- Length: 240 ft (73 m)
- Beam: 21 ft 10 in (6.65 m)
- Draft: 13 ft 6 in (4.11 m)
- Speed: 14.5 knots (26.9 km/h; 16.7 mph) surfaced; 11 knots (20 km/h; 13 mph) submerged
- Complement: 38 officers and men
- Armament: 1 × 4 in (100 mm)/50 deck gun; 5 × 21-inch (533 mm) torpedo tubes

USS S-51 (SS-162) was a fourth-group (S-48) S-class submarine of the United States Navy, known for a 1925 accident that killed 33 of its crew.

== Construction and commissioning ==
S-51′s keel was laid down on 22 December 1919 by the Lake Torpedo Boat Company of Bridgeport, Connecticut. She was launched on 20 August 1921, sponsored by Mrs. R. J. Mills, and commissioned on 24 June 1922.

== Operations ==
The new submarine was based at New London, Connecticut on 1 July 1922 as a unit of Submarine Division 4 (SubDiv 4) and followed a normal peacetime training cycle, operating out of her home port with visits to Newport, Rhode Island, and Providence, Rhode Island. She departed from New York City on 4 January 1924 for the Panama Canal Zone to participate in winter fleet maneuvers off Panama and in the Caribbean Sea. During this cruise, she visited Trinidad, Guantanamo Bay, Culebra, and St. Thomas, Virgin Islands. After returning to New York City on 30 April, she resumed type training off Block Island and in New England coastal waters.

== Sinking ==
On 25 September 1925, S-51 was operating on the surface near Block Island, with her running lights on. The merchant steamer City of Rome spotted a single white masthead light but was unable to determine its course, speed, or intentions. The ship altered her course away from the unknown light to give whatever it might be greater leeway. Meanwhile, S-51 spotted the ship's masthead and green sidelights and held her course as she was required to do by the Rules of the Road then in effect. Shortly after altering course, City of Rome spotted the submarine's red sidelight and realized that they were on collision courses. She turned and backed her engines, but it was too late. Twenty-two minutes after first spotting the submarine's masthead light, the steamer rammed her at the position 41°14′30″N 71°16′16″W.

Only three of the 36 men in the submarine (Dewey G. Kile, Michael E. Lira, and Alfred Geier) were able to abandon ship before she sank.

The courts found City of Rome at fault for not reducing her speed when in doubt as to the movement of S-51 and for not signaling her change of course. However, both the district court and the Circuit Court of Appeals found S-51 at fault for having improper lights.

The United States Navy argued that it was not practicable to have submarines of this class comply with the letter of the law and that, as a special type of warship, S-51 was under no legal compulsion to do so. The court responded by saying if these statements were correct, then submarines "should confine their operation to waters not being traversed by other ships."

== Salvage ==
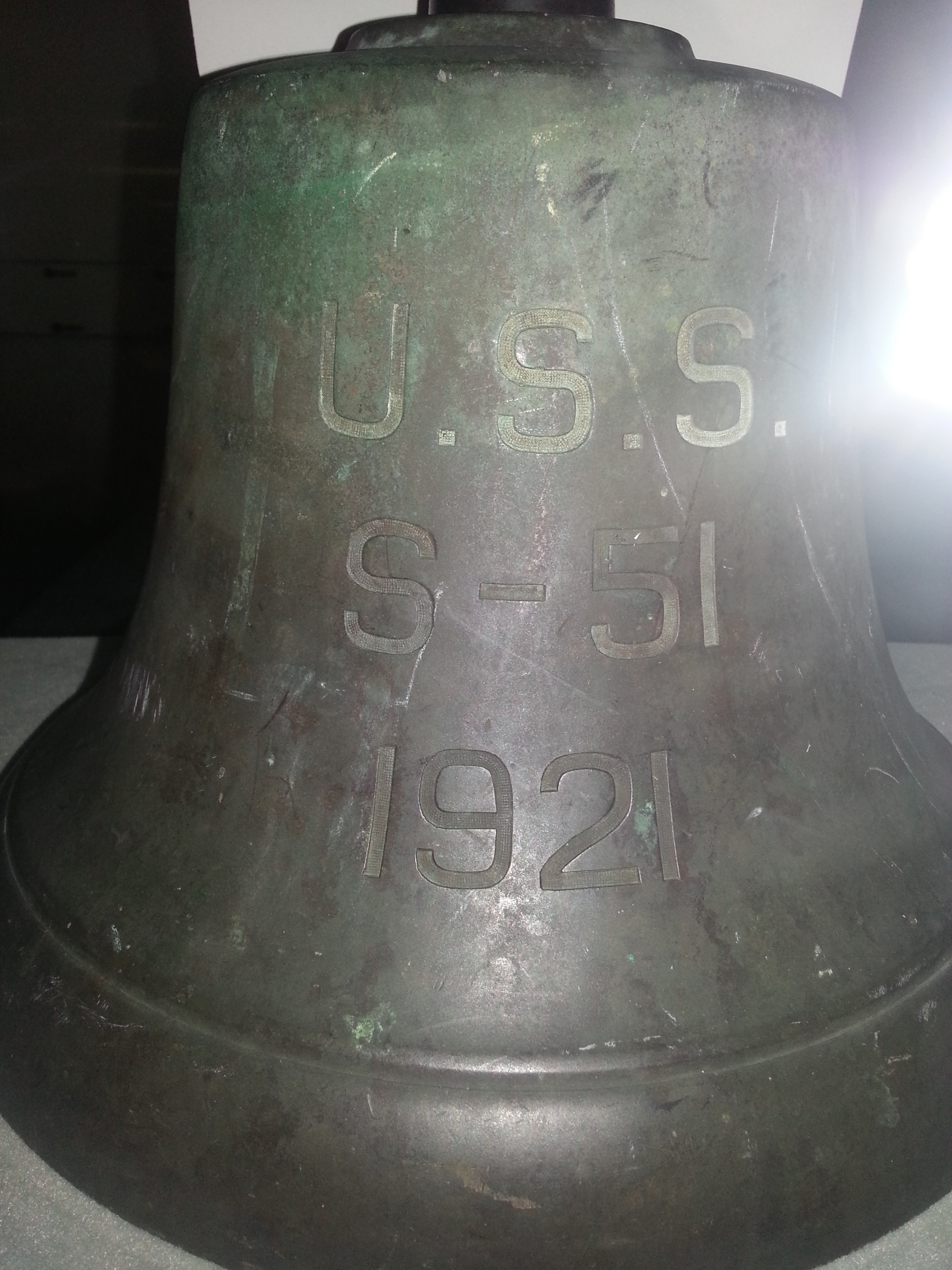
Bell of S-51 in July 2013

S-51 was raised on 5 July 1926 by a team led by Lieutenant Commander Edward Ellsberg, with Lieutenant Henry Hartley assisting. The entire salvage operation was commanded by Captain Ernest J. King. While being towed to the Brooklyn Navy Yard, she ran aground on Man-o'-War Reef in the East River on 8 July 1926 as a result of poor shiphandling by a civilian harbour pilot. She was subsequently freed from the reef and towed to the navy yard. She was stricken from the Naval Vessel Register on 27 January 1930 and sold for scrap on 23 June to the Borough Metal Company of Brooklyn, New York. S-51's bell was removed and taken to the Submarine Force Library and Museum at Groton, Connecticut.

== In Culture ==
The sinking of USS S-51 is memorialized in the popular song, "Sinking of the Submarine S-51," by Maggie Andrews. For solo guitar and mouth harp accompaniment, the song was recorded by tenor Al Craver (pseudonym for Vernon Dalhart) on Columbia 78 RPM record 15044-D (141099), on October 9, 1925.

Edward Ellsberg described the raising of the S-51 in his 1929 book, On the Bottom.
