= Philippine Congressional Medal =

Service medal of the US Army

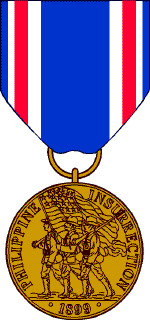
- Obverse
- Type: Service medal
- Awarded for: Enlisting for the Philippine-American War
- Presented by: Department of War
- Status: Obsolete
- Service ribbon of the medal

The Philippine Congressional Medal was a service medal of the United States Army which was established by the United States Congress on 9 July 1906. The medal recognized those soldiers who had enlisted in the United States Army for the purpose of the serving in the Philippine–American War.

== Criteria ==
The four primary criteria, to be awarded the Philippine Congressional Medal, were as follows:

- Enlisted between 21 April and 26 October 1898
- Served beyond 11 April 1899
- Served in the Philippines after 6 July 1899
- Received an honorable discharge (or died prior to being discharged)

The medal was different from the Philippine Campaign Medal in that the Philippine Campaign Medal recognized general service in the Philippines while the Philippine Congressional Medal was intended for special services rendered.

The Philippine Congressional Medal was considered an authorized military decoration, but soon became regarded as a commemorative medal since it recognized a single event and also was not eligible for presentation to the United States Navy and Marine Corps.

== Appearance ==
The Philippine Congressional Medal is 1 1/4 inches (32 mm) in diameter made of bronze with an oxidized and relieved finish. The obverse of the medal depicts a color guard of one flag bearer accompanied by two soldiers bearing rifles, marching toward the left of the medal. Around the edge of the medal are the words PHILIPPINE INSURRECTION. In the exergue is the date 1899. The reverse bears the inscription FOR PATRIOTISM FORTITUDE AND LOYALTY surrounded by a wreath of pine branches on the left and palms on the right, tied at the bottom with a bow. The suspension and service ribbons are ultramarine blue with edge stripes of red and white. The outside white stripes are 1/16 in (1.6 mm) from the edge and 1/16 in (1.6 mm) wide. The inside stripes of old glory red and white are 1/8 in (3.2 mm) wide.

== See also ==
- Awards and decorations of the United States military
