= Philippine Campaign Medal =

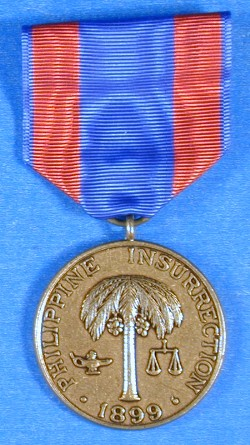
- Obverse
- Type: Medal
- Presented by: Department of War and Department of the Navy
- Eligibility: Service in the Philippine-American War
- Status: Obsolete
- ribbon and streamer

The Philippine Campaign Medal is a medal of the United States Armed Forces which was created to denote service of U.S. military men in the Philippine–American War between the years of 1899 and 1913. Although a single service medal, the Philippine Campaign Medal was issued under separate criteria for both the United States Army and the U.S. Navy.

The Philippine Campaign Medal was a separate award from the Philippine Congressional Medal, which was an Army medal awarded for special services rendered during the Philippine–American War.

== Army ==
The Army's version of the Philippine Campaign Medal was established on January 12, 1905 by order of the United States War Department. The medal was authorized to any Army servicemen who had served in campaigns ashore, on the Philippine Islands, from February 4, 1899 to a date which was then yet to be determined. In January 1914, the Philippine Campaign Medal was declared closed with the following the approved operations for issuance.

- Any action in the Philippines between February 4, 1899 and July 4, 1902.
- Service in the Department of Mindanao between February 4, 1899 and December 31, 1904.
- Actions against the Pulajanes on Leyte Island between July 20, 1906 and June 30, 1907
- Military actions on Samar between August 2, 1904, and June 30, 1907.
- Military actions against Pala on Jolo between April and May, 1905.
- Military actions against Datu Ali on Mindanao in October 1905.
- Military actions against hostile Moros on Mount Bud-Dajo, Jolo in March 1906.
- Military actions against hostile Moros on Mount Bagsac, Jolo, between January and July 1913.
- Military actions against hostile Moros on Mindanao or Jolo between 1910 and 1913.
- Any action in which a U.S. servicemen was killed or wounded or was involved in a hostile action between February 4, 1899, and December 31, 1913.

The Army's Philippine Campaign Medal was issued as a one time service medal regardless of the number of campaigns in which a servicemen participated. The Silver Citation Star was authorized for those who had performed feats of heroism or bravery.

== Navy ==
Navy version obverse, with the words "Philippine Campaign" and the years 1899 - 1903

The Navy version of the Philippine Campaign Medal was established on June 27, 1908 by special order of the United States Navy Department. The obverse (front) of this medal was the same for both services, while the reverse included the service name.

To be awarded the Philippine Campaign Medal, a Navy or Marine Corps service member was required to perform service in the Philippine Islands between February 4, 1899 and December 31, 1904. Such service was required to be either ashore in support of Army units or on board certain vessels assigned to the area of the Philippine Sea. The Navy version of the Philippine Campaign Medal was as a one-time award with no devices authorized.

== Appearance ==
The Army and Navy versions of the Philippine Campaign Medal varied slightly in the design with the Army's version of the award displaying a bronze medallion with the words "Philippine Insurrection" centered above the year numeral 1898 and below a palm tree and Roman lamp. The ribbon for the Army's medal consisted of a wide blue ribbon with two red stripes.

The Navy Philippine Campaign Medal was originally considered a completely separate award from the Army medal and appeared as suspended from a red and yellow ribbon.

On August 12, 1913, the Navy changed the ribbon color to match the Army's version of the award and from that point on the Army and Navy Philippine Campaign Medals were considered the same award but with different medal styles. The Navy's Philippine Campaign Medal displayed a bronze medallion with the words "Philippine Campaign", centered above the dates "1898–1903", and below a depiction of a stone gate leading into Manila.
