= Charles Wesley Shilling =

U.S. Navy physician, researcher, and educator

Charles Wesley Shilling, MD
- Born: September 21, 1901; Upland, Indiana
- Died: December 23, 1994 (aged 93); Fredericksburg, Virginia
- Burial place: Arlington National Cemetery
- Military career
- Allegiance: United States of America
- Branch: United States Navy
- Service years: 1927–1955
- Rank: Captain
- Nickname: Chuck
- Awards: Golden Cross of the Order of the Phoenix

Captain Charles Wesley Shilling (September 21, 1901 – December 23, 1994) was an American physician who was known as a leader in the field of undersea and hyperbaric medicine, research, and education. Shilling was widely recognized as an expert on deep sea diving, naval medicine, radiation biology, and submarine capabilities. In 1939, he was Senior Medical Officer in the rescue of the submarine U.S.S. Squalus.

== Background ==
Shilling was born September 21, 1901, in Indiana on the campus of Taylor University where his father was President. Shilling later went on to receive a Bachelor of Science from Taylor University along with a Bachelor of Arts from the University of Michigan in 1923.

After completion of his medical training at the University of Michigan, Shilling completed an internship at the Chelsea Naval Hospital.

In 1932, the Navy sent Shilling to the Harvard School of Public Health where he was joined by Albert R. Behnke.

In 1954, Shilling received an honorary Doctorate of Science from Taylor University.

== Naval career ==
After joining the Navy in 1927, Shilling was sent to the Naval Submarine Base in New London, Connecticut where he was involved in the selection and training of submarine crew. Other work included research and development of Submarine Escape Immersion Equipment aboard the USS S-4. Shilling was transferred to the submarine base in the Panama Canal Zone where he spent two years serving as medical officer aboard submarines as they traversed the canal. This work also included treating the medical problems associated with salvage diving operations.

From Panama, Shilling was transferred to the Navy Diving School in Washington, D.C., where he learned to dive and began diving research at the Navy Experimental Diving Unit. Shilling researched the topics of nitrogen narcosis, oxygen toxicity, and decompression table development including important research on surface decompression.

In the late 1930s, Shilling was transferred back to the New London Submarine Base where he focused on hearing and vision for submariners. His work involved the development of the methods and tools needed for selection of sound listening and lookout duty. In 1939, a failed request for a $78.00 audiometer resulted in receiving $3,000.00. This small amount was spent to begin the first medical research laboratory dedicated to submarine research. This laboratory grew to become the Naval Submarine Medical Research Laboratory (NSMRL).

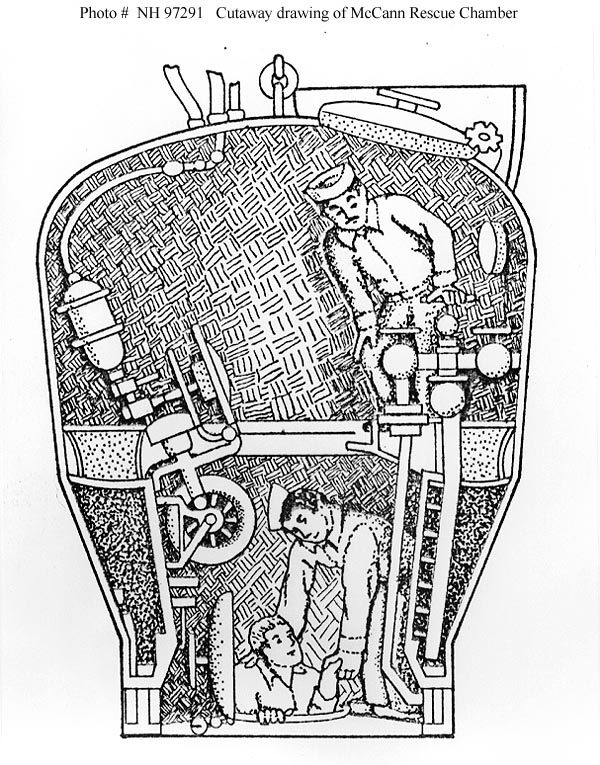
Cutaway drawing of the McCann Rescue Chamber used to rescue crewmen from the sunken submarine USS Squalus in May 1939.

In 1939, Shilling was the Senior Medical Officer in the rescue of personnel from the submarine USS Squalus. Divers from the submarine rescue ship Falcon, under the direction of the salvage and rescue expert Charles Momsen, employed the new Rescue Chamber he had invented years earlier but which the US Navy command had repeatedly blocked. Earlier in development of the bell, they demonstrated that a bell could attach to a submarine torpedo room hatch but the submarine crew had not decided who should transfer to the surface in the bell. One of the crew stated, within Shilling's hearing, "Take the Doc. He's the most useless piece of furniture we've got". Shilling then became the first person to go from a submarine to the surface in a bell. Utilizing these techniques, they were able to rescue all 33 surviving crew members from the sunken submarine including future Rear Admiral Oliver F. Naquin. Shilling later recalled that the untested submarine rescue procedures utilized with the Squalus incident "worked like a charm". Later, the salvage divers used recently developed heliox diving schedules and successfully avoided the cognitive impairment symptoms associated with such deep dives, thereby confirming Behnke's theory of nitrogen narcosis.

In 1947, Shilling left NSMRL for a position in the Office of Naval Research (ONR). Four years of this post were spent directing medical, biological, and psychological studies and ended with two years as the director of the Research Division, Bureau of Medicine and Surgery as well as the special assistant for the BioSciences. During his time at ONR, he established the Committee on Hearing and the Committee on Vision for the Armed Services National Research Council.

Shilling's naval career ended with a post at the United States Naval Academy where he served as the Senior Medical Officer, Command Medical Officer for the Severn River Naval Command, and the head of the Department of Hygiene at ONR.

== Civilian career ==
Upon retirement from the Navy, Shilling served as deputy director, Division of Biology and Medicine at the United States Atomic Energy Commission from 1955 to 1960. Here he managed multimillion-dollar research programs.

In October 1961, Shilling was appointed to head the Biology Science Communications Project that was located at the American Institute of Biological Sciences and later moved to George Washington University. This project was funded by a grant from the National Science Foundation to study "all phases of the communications problems as they relate to the biological sciences and scientists". A major focus of this project was indexing and abstracting the world serial publications and ensuring their availability in the United States. One important achievement was the organization of the Council of Biological Editors whose style guide provides guidelines for publications in the biological sciences.

By 1973, the Undersea Medical Society (UMS), now the Undersea and Hyperbaric Medical Society, had grown to the point of needing an office and hired Shilling as the first Executive secretary. Here, Shilling applied his knowledge in diving medicine and biological communications to establish the UMS scientific journal, Undersea Biomedical Research. The journal continued under the name Undersea Biomedical Research until 1993 when it was changed to Undersea and Hyperbaric Medicine Journal.

Shilling's experience with hyperbaric oxygen (HBO) in the treatment of decompression sickness allowed him to connect the diving community with the growing clinical HBO community. In 1975, Shilling gathered 50 experts in HBO therapy for a workshop conceived by Dr. Behnke. The workshop was chaired by Dr. Jefferson Davis and the group eventually published the definitive text Hyperbaric Oxygen Therapy. The UMS also created a committee to periodically review the scientific evidence supporting the use of HBO and the first Hyperbaric Oxygen Committee Report was published in 1977. Shilling served as Executive secretary until his retirement in 1987.

Following his retirement from the UHMS, Shilling took a two-year post as Distinguished scientist at the Armed Forces Institute of Pathology.

== Charles W. Shilling Library ==
Shilling's portrait at the Duke University Medical Center Library

The Undersea and Hyperbaric Medical Society's library was started by the efforts of Dr. Shilling. The UHMS Charles W. Shilling Library is the largest repository of diving and hyperbaric research and clinical information –current and historical–in the world. The library is located at the Duke University Medical Center (DUMC) Library in Durham, North Carolina. The collection consists of books, journals, reports, workshops, symposia, conference proceedings, and annotated bibliographies spanning the fields of diving, hyperbaric, and marine medicine. There is a small journal and newsletter collection dealing with diving safety and diving medicine. The library has extensive reprint files of articles, cataloged by author, related to diving and hyperbaric medicine and dating back to the 1930s.

Many of the UHMS publications have been scanned and are available online at the Rubicon Research Repository. Other articles can be found in the DUMC Archive finding aids.

Shilling's portrait, painted by Daniel Thompson of the Corcoran Gallery and School of Art, was dedicated October 23, 1994. It currently resides on the second floor of the DUMC Library.

== Memberships and awards ==
Shilling was a member of the Society for Experimental Biology and Medicine, the American Physiological Society, the Association of Military Surgeons of the United States, the Aerospace Medical Association, the American Academy of Arts and Sciences, and Sigma Xi. Shilling received the Founders Medal from the Association of Military Surgeons for work in diving medicine (1953); the Distinguished Alumni Award from the University of Michigan (1959); the Golden Cross of the Order of the Phoenix from the Greek Government for creating a method of radiation sterilization of a fly, a technique which helped save the Greek olive crop (1960); Alumnus of the Year from Taylor University (1960); the Albert Behnke Award from the UHMS (1975); the New Orleans Grand Isle (NOGI) Award from the Academy of Underwater Arts and Sciences (1979); the Chamber of Achievement Award from Taylor University (1980); the Florida Underwater Council Service Award (1980); the Smithsonian Science Information Exchange Award (1980); the Schiffahrtmedizinsches Institut Der Marine Award (1980); and in 1982, the Undersea and Hyperbaric Medical Society established the C.W. Shilling Award in his honor, Shilling was also the first recipient. He was a member of the Cosmos Club, where he and his wife used to like to take friends to dinner.

== Publications ==
- Charles W. Shilling, Margaret F. Werts and Nancy R. Schandelmeier (1976): The Underwater Handbook. A Guide to Physiology and Performance for the Engineer. 912 pp. John Wiley & Sons. ISBN 0-471-99453-7.
- Underwater Medicine and Related Sciences: A Guide to the Literature: an annotated bibliography, key word index, and microthesaurus. 632 pages, Gordon & Breach Science Publishers Ltd; First edition (July 8, 1971) ISBN 978-0677039206
  - Volume One – Charles W Shilling and Margaret F Werts (eds).
  - Volume Two – Margaret F Werts and Charles W Shilling (eds).
  - Volume Three – Margaret F Werts and Charles W Shilling (eds).
  - Volume Four – Margaret F Werts and Charles W Shilling (eds).
  - Volume Five – Charles W Shilling, Lyn E Teven, and Margaret F Werts (eds).
  - Volume Six – Charles W Shilling and Lyn E Teven (eds).

== Death ==
Shilling died on December 23, 1994, in Fredericksburg, Virginia. He is buried in Arlington National Cemetery with his wife Miriam.
