= Albert R. Behnke =

US Navy physician and diving medicine researcher

Albert Richard Behnke Jr., MD
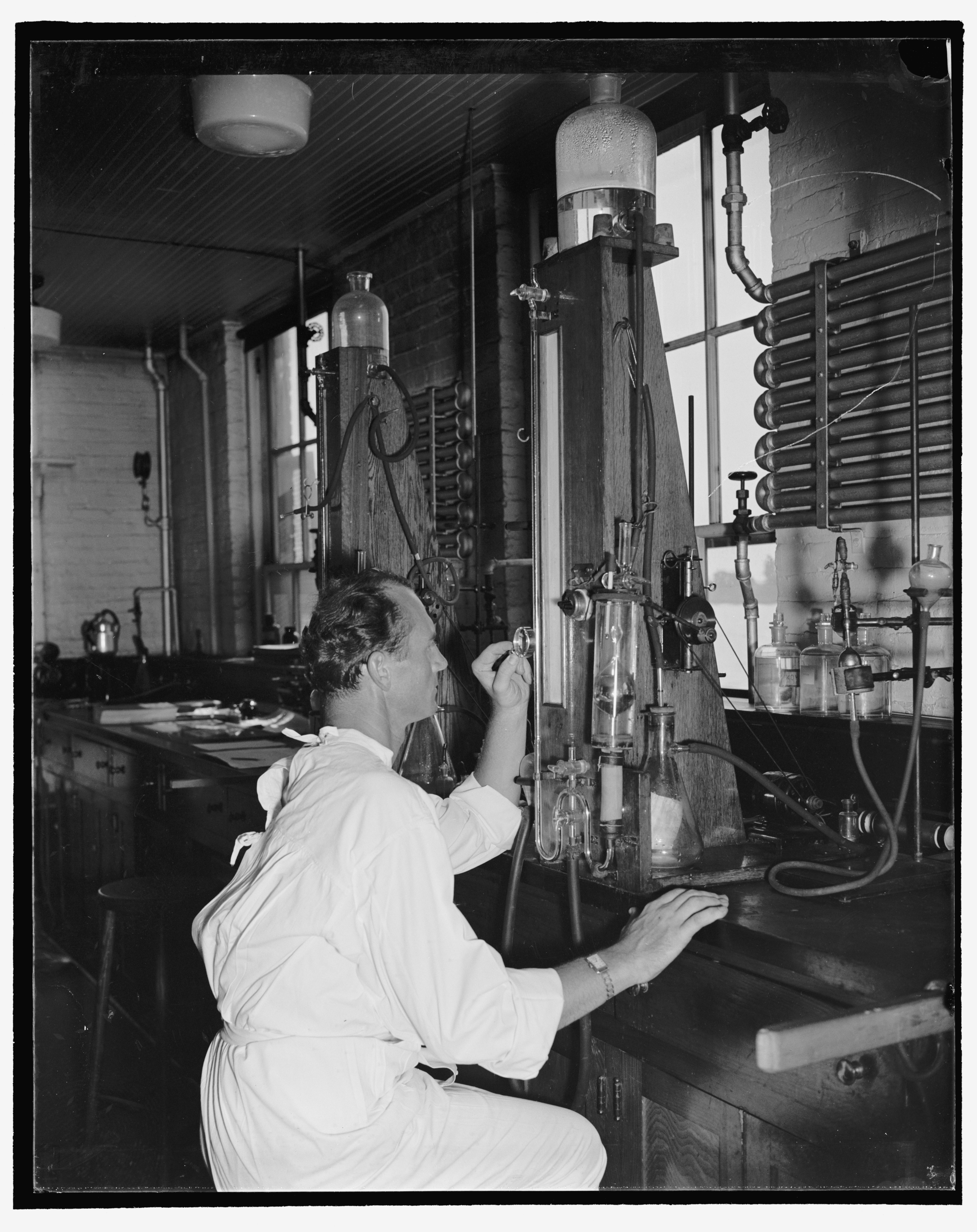
- Born: August 8, 1903; Chicago, Illinois
- Died: January 16, 1992 (aged 88); San Francisco, California
- Military career
- Allegiance: United States of America
- Branch: United States Navy
- Service years: 1929–1959
- Rank: Captain
- Nickname: McGinty
- Awards: Navy and Marine Corps Medal

Captain Albert Richard Behnke Jr. USN (ret.) (August 8, 1903 – January 16, 1992) was an American physician, who was principally responsible for developing the U.S. Naval Medical Research Institute. Behnke separated the symptoms of Arterial Gas Embolism (AGE) from those of decompression sickness and suggested the use of oxygen in recompression therapy.

Behnke is also known as the "modern-day father" of human body composition for his work in developing the hydrodensitometry method of measuring body density, his standard man and woman models as well as a somatogram based on anthropometric measurements.

== Early life ==
Behnke was born August 8, 1903, in Chicago, Illinois. He moved to New Mexico and settled in Whittier, California, by 1912. Behnke graduated from Whittier College in 1925 and moved to San Francisco to attend medical school at Stanford University. Stanford Medical School required a one-year internship prior to conferring a medical doctorate. Behnke joined the United States Navy and completed his internship at the Mare Island Naval Hospital in 1930. In 1932, the Navy sent Behnke to the Harvard School of Public Health.

== Naval career ==
Following medical school in 1930, Behnke found his lifelong interest in deep sea diving when he was assigned as an assistant medical officer to USS Holland and Submarine Division Twenty in San Diego under the command of Chester W. Nimitz. In addition to his other duties, Behnke spent time covering medical watch on USS Ortolan, a submarine rescue ship, where he performed his first hard hat dive.

In 1932 Behnke wrote a letter to the Surgeon General that was published in the United States Naval Medical Bulletin outlining the possible causes of arterial gas embolisms he was seeing related to submarine escape training. This separated the symptoms of arterial gas embolism (AGE) from those of decompression sickness. This letter caught the attention of the director of the submarine medicine in the Bureau of Medicine, Captain E.W. Brown. Brown sent Behnke to do postgraduate work at the Harvard School of Public Health and research on diving and submarine medicine with fellow student Charles W. Shilling. Philip Drinker asked Behnke to stay for two additional years and the Navy allowed it.

Lieutenant junior grade Behnke was then sent to Pearl Harbor in 1935 to the Submarine Escape Training Tower. Later that year, Behnke et al. experimented with oxygen for recompression therapy. Evidence of the effectiveness of recompression therapy utilizing oxygen was later shown by Yarbrough and Behnke and has since become the standard of care for treatment of DCS.

Behnke also began to outline his idea for a medical laboratory in 1936. That outline would eventually become the Naval Medical Research Institute (NMRI) now located with the National Naval Medical Center. In 1937, Behnke introduced the "no-stop" decompression tables.

After being transferred to Washington, D.C., in 1938, Behnke was assigned to medical duty at the Experimental Diving Unit (NEDU).

The submarine USS Squalus sank in 1939 and Behnke responded with fellow NEDU personnel Commanders Charles Momsen and Allan McCann, Yarbrough and Wilmon, and master diver James McDonald with more divers. They met Shilling on site to begin work. Divers from the submarine rescue ship Falcon, under the direction of the salvage and rescue expert Momsen, employed the new Rescue Chamber he had invented years earlier but which the US Navy command had repeatedly blocked. They were able to rescue all 33 surviving crew members from the sunken submarine including future Rear Admiral Oliver F. Naquin. The salvage divers used recently developed heliox diving schedules and successfully avoided the cognitive impairment symptoms associated with such deep dives, thereby confirming Behnke's theory of nitrogen narcosis.

Later in 1939, Behnke and Yarborough demonstrated that gases other than nitrogen also could cause narcosis. From his results, he deduced that xenon gas could serve as an anesthetic, even under normobaric conditions but was too scarce to allow for confirmation. Although Lazharev, in Russia, apparently studied xenon anesthesia in 1941, the first published report confirming xenon anesthesia was in 1946 by J. H. Lawrence, who experimented on mice. Xenon was first used as a surgical anesthetic in 1951 by Stuart C. Cullen, who successfully operated on two patients.

Taking advantage of the positive public support for Navy diving following the Squalus rescue, Behnke contacted Franklin D. Roosevelt and with Presidential interest known, received approval for the construction of his research laboratory (NMRI).

On December 7, 1941, when the attack on Pearl Harbor began, Behnke was at sea on USS Lexington and immediately reassigned to medical posts around Hawaii.

Behnke returned to Washington and soon opened NMRI as the "research executive" in October 1942. Behnke focused his interest in how physical fitness and fat content effects inert gas elimination and started projects to evaluate this relationship. His research lead us to consider him the "modern-day father" of human body composition for "his pioneering studies of hydrostatic weighing in 1942, the development of a reference man and woman model, and somatogram based on anthropometric measurements underlie much current work in body composition assessment"

In 1942 Behnke made the first proposal for operational saturation diving and its economic benefit pertaining to work in caissons and pressurized tunnels.

When the people of Occupied Germany were suffering from starvation, Behnke focused his attention to increasing their food ration.

Behnke remained at NMRI until 1950 when he was transferred to his final assignment at the Naval Radiological Defense Laboratory (NRDL) at the San Francisco Naval Shipyard. His work on physical fitness and body habitus continued in projects surrounding radiological shelters and decontamination.

In 1950, Behnke earned the Navy and Marine Corps Medal "for saving the life of a civilian skin diver who surfaced too quickly off Monterey. Behnke, then a Navy captain, spent two days in a decompression chamber with the man."

Upon retiring from the Navy in 1959, Behnke turned over command of the NRDL to Captain Harry S. Etter.

== Civilian career ==
Upon his retirement from the Navy in 1959, Behnke became a professor of preventive medicine at the University of California and Director of the Institute of Applied Biology, Presbyterian Medical Center, San Francisco, California.

Behnke served on the first Board of Advisors for the National Association of Underwater Instructors and taught medical aspects of diving at their first Instructor Candidate Course that started on August 26, 1960, in Houston, TX.

The bends prevention and safety program for crews working in underground caissons to build the Bay Area Rapid Transit system was designed by Behnke in 1964.

Behnke with several other researchers founded the Undersea Medical Society (now the Undersea and Hyperbaric Medical Society) in 1967.

The term "oxygen window" was first used by Behnke in 1967. Behnke refers to early work by Momsen on "partial pressure vacancy" (PPV) where he used partial pressures of O2 and He as high as 2-3 ATA to create a maximal PPV. Behnke then goes on to describe "isobaric inert gas transport" or "inherent unsaturation" as termed by LeMessurier and Hills, and separately by Hills, who made their independent observations at the same time. Van Liew et al. also made a similar observation that they did not name at the time. The clinical significance of their work was later shown by Sass.

In 1975, Behnke was involved with experiments on cosmic particle radiation for the Apollo program.

== Behnke award ==
Starting in 1969, the Behnke award has been given annually by the Undersea and Hyperbaric Medical Society, Inc. to a scientist for outstanding scientific contributions to advances in undersea biomedical activity. The award carries an honorarium and a plaque. The first recipient was Behnke.

== Awards and honors ==
Established in 1916 and awarded by the Association of Military Surgeons of the United States, the Sir Henry S. Wellcome Medal and Prize is awarded annually for "the research work most valuable for the military service performed in any branch of medicine, surgery, or sanitation". Behnke was the 1941 recipient.

Behnke received the American College of Sports Medicine's Honor Award in 1976.

In 1977, Behnke was awarded an honorary Doctor of Science (Sc.D.) degree from Whittier College.

The Navy dedicated the NMRI Hyperbaric Research Facility on July 1, 1981, to Behnke.
