= USS Wandank (AT-26) =

United States Navy fleet tug

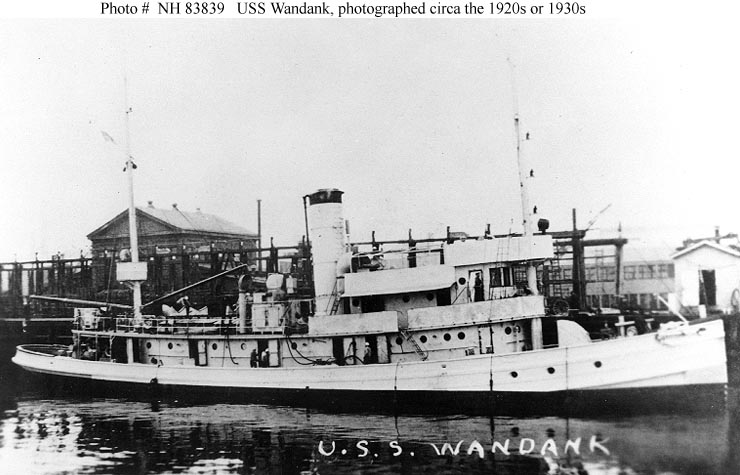
- USS Wandank (AT-26) in the 1920s or 1930s

History

United States
- Name: USS Wandank
- Builder: Ferguson Steel and Iron Company, Buffalo, New York
- Laid down: 7 April 1919
- Launched: 21 October 1919
- Commissioned: 23 March 1920
- Decommissioned: 31 March 1922
- Recommissioned: 8 May 1922
- Decommissioned: 20 September 1946
- Reclassified: From Fleet Tug No. 26 to AT-26 1920; From AT-26 to ATO-26 15 May 1944
- Stricken: 13 November 1946
- Fate: Transferred to Maritime Commission 17 July 1947
- Notes: In commercial service as W. A. Bisso 1947-1971

General characteristics
- Class & type: Algorma-class fleet tug
- Displacement: 795 tons
- Length: 156 ft 8 in (47.75 m)
- Beam: 30 ft 0 in (9.14 m)
- Draft: 14 ft 7 in (4.45 m) mean
- Speed: 13 knots
- Complement: 25
- Armament: none

The first USS Wandank (AT-26), originally Fleet Tug No. 26, later ATO-26, was a United States Navy fleet tug in commission from 1920 to 1922 and again from 1922 to 1946.

USS Wandank (Fleet Tug No. 26) was laid down on 7 April 1919 at Buffalo, New York, by the Ferguson Steel and Iron Company. She was launched on 21 October 1919 and commissioned on 23 March 1920. Later that year, her designation was changed from Fleet Tug No. 26 to AT-26 as the U.S. Navy instituted its alphanumeric hull classification system.

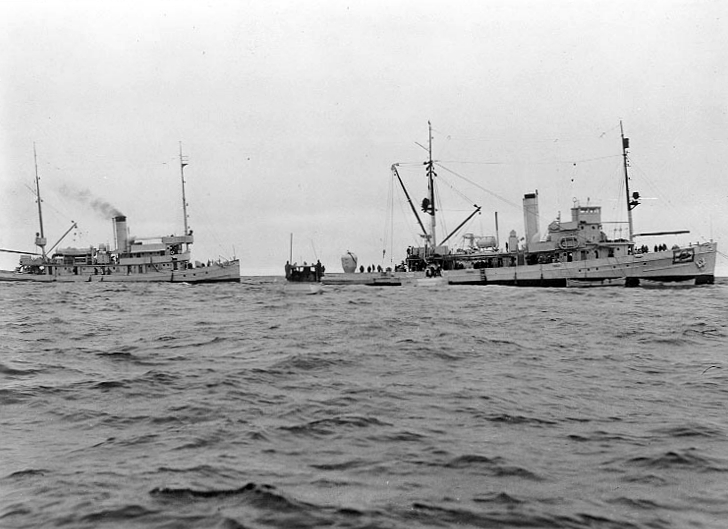
Wandalk (left) and submarine rescue vessel USS Falcon (ASR-2) during operations to rescue the crew of sunken submarine USS Squalus (SS-192) ca. 24 May 1939. The McCann Rescue Chamber is on Falcon's after deck.

Assigned to the 5th Naval District, Wandank operated out of Norfolk, Virginia, until decommissioned on 31 March 1922. Recommissioned on 8 May 1922, Wandank resumed the provision of tug services out of Norfolk for the United States Atlantic Fleet in the Hampton Roads-Virginia Capes area. During the summer of 1939, she operated off Portsmouth, New Hampshire, first to assist in rescuing 33 crewmen from the sunken submarine USS Squalus (SS-192) in May 1939, and later to assist in raising the submarine herself, including towing of the raised submarine to shallower water in August 1939.

Wandank was transferred to Boston, Massachusetts, on 8 October 1940 for special duty in the 1st Naval District. She operated out of Boston on coastal towing duties throughout World War II. Her duties included towing yard oilers and other small craft and participating in the towing of transport USS Wakefield (AP-21), which had been severely damaged by fire in September 1942.

On 15 May 1944, Wandank's designation was changed again, to ATO-26.

Decommissioned on 20 September 1946 and struck from the Navy List on 13 November 1946, Wandank was transferred to the Maritime Commission on 17 July 1947 and simultaneously delivered to W. A. Bisso of New Orleans, Louisiana. She was then in commercial service for the New Orleans Coal and Bisso Towboat Company as W. A. Bisso until 1971.
