= Frontline Test Equipment =

American software trouble-shooting company

Frontline Test Equipment, Inc.
- Company type: Subsidiary
- Industry: Communication test equipment
- Founded: 1985
- Founder: Eric Kaplan
- Headquarters: Charlottesville, Virginia, United States
- Products: Bluetooth, Bluetooth low energy, USB, RS-232/422/485, Ethernet, 802.15.4/ZigBee, industrial communication protocols
- Website: www.fte.com

Frontline Test Equipment, Inc is a communication trouble-shooting software company based in Charlottesville, Virginia, US. Founded in 1985, Frontline became an employee-owned company in 2009. On April 7, 2016, Teledyne LeCroy announced it had acquired Frontline Test Equipment.

Frontline is also notable for RS-232/422/485 protocol analyzers.

== Products ==
When a new communication technology or product is being developed, hardware and software engineers rely heavily on protocol analyzers, also known as sniffers or bus analyzers to identify problems and speed the development process. Frontline provides PC-based protocol analyzers for developers and industrial applications.

In the past 25 years, Frontline has released several protocol analyzers. Their currently listed products are:

- ComProbe BPA 600 Dual Mode Bluetooth Protocol Analyzer for Classic Bluetooth and Bluetooth low energy technology * ComProbe BPA low energy Analyzer - an affordable, low energy only Bluetooth analyzer.
- ComProbe 802.11 Analyzer,
- Frontline Bluetooth Low Energy Protocol Analyzer,
- CRT4BT, Codenomicon Robustness Tester for Bluetooth
- FTS4USB USB Protocol Analyzer,
- Serialtest,
- NetDecoder for ControlNet and numerous additional industrial protocols and buses, and
- Ethertest.
