= EKF =

EKF may refer to:

- EKF Diagnostics, a European healthcare company
- European Karate Federation
- European Kendo Federation
- Europe–Korea Foundation
- Extended Kalman filter
