= IP load tester =

Performance analyzer for routers

IP load testers are a class of protocol analyzers focused on the practical evaluation of router performance. Router performance is usually broken down into two categories: forwarding performance (or data plane), and routing performance (or control plane). In practice, the two functions are often evaluated simultaneously.

To test forwarding performance, IP load testers typically surround a router with simulated Internet traffic. This function is called packet blasting, and there are a couple of popular methods. The first method approximates real Internet traffic by using a representative mix of packet lengths, usually referred to as IMIX. Another popular technique is to blast the router with the shortest packet lengths possible, in order to stress the computational performance of the router. In both cases, the IP load tester measures the performance of the router in terms of loss, latency and throughput.

To test the control plane, IP load testers typically emulate various protocols via the test ports in order to connect to the real implementations of those protocols on the router itself. For example, within the core of the Internet, various routing protocols are used for the control plane, or routing function of routers. Core routing protocols include BGP, IS-IS, OSPF, and RIP. Control plane performance is usually characterized by measurements of scalability and performance. Scalability typically means how many protocol sessions can be handled by the router at one time, and ultimately is a stress of memory. Performance usually refers to a time-varying parameter, such as sessions per second, and ultimately is a stress of CPU power.
