= EKF Diagnostics =

European healthcare company

- Company type: Public company
- Traded as: LSE: EKF; EKF Diagnostics Holdings plc
- Industry: Health Care; Biotechnology
- Predecessor: EKF Diagnostics GmbH
- Founded: Barleben, Germany (1990)
- Founder: Berthold Walter
- Headquarters: Cardiff, United Kingdom
- Area served: Worldwide
- Key people: Christopher Mills (Non-Executive Chairman); Mike Salter (Chief Executive Officer); Marc Davies (Chief Financial Officer)
- Revenue: ▲£21.658 million (2011)
- Total assets: ▲£58.733 million (2011)
- Total equity: ▲£37.427 million (2011)
- Number of employees: 295 (2011)
- Subsidiaries: Argutus Medical; Quotient Diagnostics; Stanbio Laboratory
- Website: www.ekfdiagnostics.com

EKF Diagnostics (Entwicklung, Konstruktion und Fertigung) is a publicly listed Healthcare company founded 1990 in Barleben, Germany and currently headquartered in Cardiff, Wales, UK.

EKF Diagnostics specialises in the development, manufacture and distribution of point of care analysers for hemoglobin, HbA1c, glucose, lactate as well as a range of clinical chemistry products and biomarker-based ELISA & rapid tests, a result of EKF Diagnostics' acquisition of Stanbio and Argutus Medical. EKF Diagnostics has nine sites in six countries and employs 295 people as of 31 December 2011.

== History ==
EKF Diagnostics began as EKF-Diagnostic GmbH when it was founded in 1990 by Berthold Walter in Barleben near Magdeburg, Germany. Initially an engineering business, the company made a slow transition during the 1990s to a medical diagnostics company when they started developing analysers for blood banks, diabetes and sports medicine markets as well as acquiring other companies in the field.

2010 was a year of major change for the company. EKF-Diagnostic GmbH was acquired by International Brand Licensing, a UK AIM-listed company which was soon renamed to EKF Diagnostics Holdings plc. EKF Diagnostics then began acquiring companies in the diagnostics field. Quotient Diagnostics based in Walton-on-Thames in Surrey was the first, it was acquired by EKF Diagnostics in October 2010 for £3.41 million. This acquisition added a range of diagnostic devices to aid the treatment and management of diabetes and associated chronic disease to EKF Diagnostics' portfolio. Two months later EKF Diagnostics bought Argutus Medical for £2.2 million. The acquisition of Argutus Medical expanded EKF Diagnostics' product portfolio to include biomarker-based diagnostic ELISA & Rapid tests.

In 2011, EKF Diagnostics acquired Stanbio Laboratory LP, a medical devices distribution and manufacturing business based in Boerne, Texas for US$25.5 million. Stanbio Life Sciences an enzyme production company was also part of this acquisition.

== Global operations ==
EKF Diagnostics has nine sites located in Germany, UK, Ireland, Poland, Russia and the US and employs 295 people as of 31 December 2011. Seven of these sites are involved in manufacture of the group's products while four of these sites are also involved in various R&D activities. EKF Diagnostics is headquartered in Cardiff, Wales while the Stanbio site in Boerne, Texas is the administrative and sales hub for the U.S.A.

== Subsidiaries ==
=== Argutus Medical ===
Argutus Medical based in Dublin, Ireland started as the biomarker division of Biotrin International. The biomarker division was then spun-out to become Argutus Medical before Biotrin was acquired by Italian diagnostic company DiaSorin S.p.A. in 2008. Argutus Medical became part of EKF Diagnostics in 2010 when it was acquired for £2.2 million. Argutus Medical brought a range of ELISA & Rapid Tests to EKF Diagnostics' product portfolio. The test kits have particular use in pharmaceutical research. Argutus Medical is currently engaged in a number of biomarker R&D programmes for acute kidney injury (nephrotoxicity) and acute liver injury (hepatotoxicity) detection. Argutus Medical is also a member of a number of external programmes including SAFE-T IMI. In April 2013, Argutus Medical announced a change in name to EKF Diagnostics Ltd for consolidation and integration purposes.

=== Quotient Diagnostics ===
Quotient Diagnostics was founded in 2002 by David Chatterton as a spin-out company from Chelsea Technologies Group. Bought by EKF Diagnostics in 2010 for £3.41 million, the Walton-on-Thames, Surrey based company are now the R&D and manufacturing base for EKF Diagnostics’ Glycated hemoglobin (HbA1c) analysers which are based on a parented Boronate Fluorescence Quenching Technology. HbA1c is becoming a preferred method for monitoring diabetes with the medical community. In 2011 the production facility was extended to 900 metres squared to meet customer demands.

=== Stanbio Laboratory ===
Stanbio Laboratory has been based in Boerne, Texas since it was established in 1960. Stanbio was acquired by EKF Diagnostics in 2011 for US$25.5 million and adds a range of medical tests and diagnostic devices including clinical chemistry, pregnancy and point-of-care blood hemoglobin tests to EKF Diagnostics' product portfolio. The Boerne site also acts as an administrative hub for EKF Diagnostics in the U.S.A. Stanbio also have a second site in Elkhart, Indiana which is an industrial fermentation plant producing enzymes for use internal use and for external clients.
