= United States Navy Experimental Diving Unit =

US military research and development unit

Coordinates: 30.1742°N 85.7554°W

Navy Experimental Diving Unit
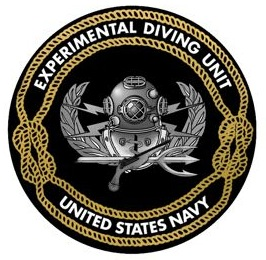
- Active: 1927
- Country: United States of America
- Branch: United States Navy
- Role: NEDU is the primary source of diving and hyperbaric operational guidance for the US Navy.
- Size: 120+
- Part of: U.S. Naval Sea Systems Command (NAVSEA)
- Garrison/HQ: US Naval Support Activity, Panama City Beach, Florida

Commanders
- Current commander: Commander Dustin Cunningham

The United States Navy Experimental Diving Unit (NEDU or NAVXDIVINGU) is the primary source of diving and hyperbaric operational guidance for the US Navy. It is located within the Naval Support Activity Panama City in Panama City Beach, Florida.

== Purpose ==
The functions of the Navy Experimental Diving Unit are to test and evaluate diving, hyperbaric, and other life-support systems and procedures, and to conduct research and development in biomedical and environmental physiology. NEDU also provides technical recommendations to the Naval Sea Systems Command to support operational requirements of the US armed forces.

== History ==
=== Brooklyn Navy Yard ===
Experimental diving in the US Navy started in 1912 at the Brooklyn Navy Yard under the leadership of Chief Gunner George D. Stillson. Stillson's research program ultimately led to increasing diver capabilities from 60 feet (18 m) to over 300 feet (91 m) of depth based on John Scott Haldane's decompression work with the Royal Navy. This resulted in the first publication of the U.S. Navy Diving Manual and established the need for a facility dedicated to research and development of diving procedures.

In 1915, Stillson's team was sent to salvage the F-4 submarine. On these deep dives, the divers experienced the debilitating effects of nitrogen narcosis leading them to try the addition of helium to their breathing mix. The navy salvage operations then came under the direction of Warrant Gunner C. L. Tibbals who led teams through the salvage of the S-51 in 1925 and S-4 in 1927 further establishing the naval need for equipment, training, and procedures for rescue operations.

=== Washington Navy Yard ===
NEDU was established in 1927 at the Washington Navy Yard.

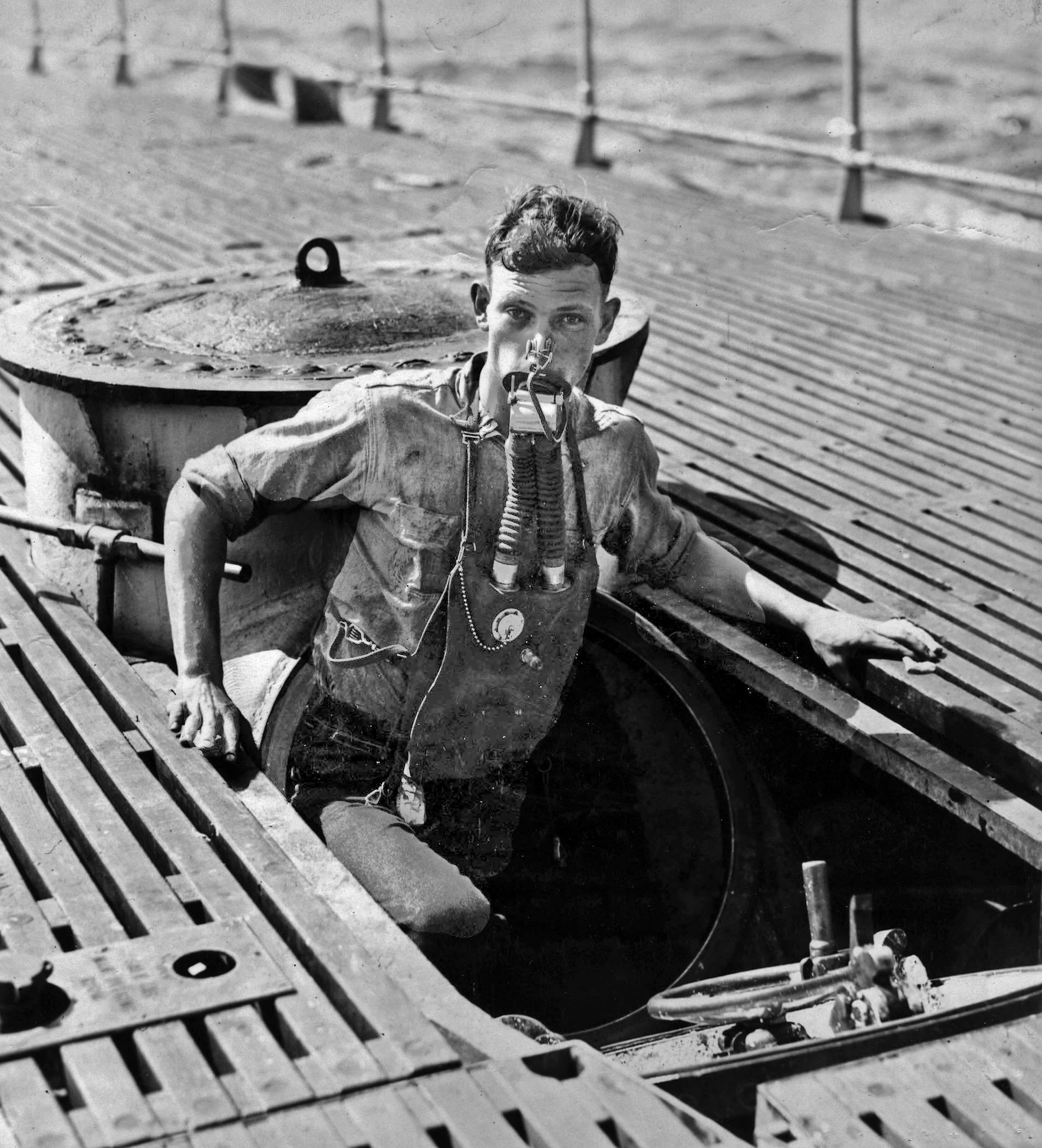
A Momsen lung in use during training

Early developments for the unit involved evaluation and testing of the Submarine Escape Lung (Momsen lung) and the McCann Rescue Bell. This work was done by Charles Momsen and Allan McCann. In 1929, Momsen received the Navy Distinguished Service Medal for personally testing the device at a depth of 200 feet (61 m). Techniques used for the rescue of submariners aboard the USS Squalus were developed by Momsen and McCann in their time at NEDU. This work lead to the rescue and recovery of 33 crewmen. Momsen and McCann received a Letter of Commendation from President of the United States Franklin D. Roosevelt for the Squalus effort.

The first medical staff were introduced to the facility in the mid-1930s when Charles W Shilling, Albert R Behnke, and OE Van der Aue began work. Their early work improved the prevention and treatment of decompression sickness with the inclusion of oxygen rather than air.

Through World War II, work continued on decompression and oxygen toxicity.

Through the 1950s NEDU tested equipment and further refined procedures for divers including the US Navy 1953 decompression table.

From 1957 to 1962 was the beginnings of saturation diving under the leadership of Captain George F. Bond of the Naval Submarine Medical Research Laboratory and the Genesis Project. Genesis D was performed at NEDU in 1963. Bond then went on to head the SEALAB I saturation project in 1964.

Robert D. Workman published a novel method to calculate decompression schedules in 1965 that involved estimating the limiting values of excess tissue supersaturation.

Work continued in deep saturation dives, equipment testing as well as thermal protection and physiology research throughout the 1960s and early 1970s.

The MK 1 lightweight mask was a modification of the commercial Kirby Morgan band mask, which NEDU tested in the early 1970s, and which was suitable for both air and mixed gas operations to 300 feet, and provided voice communications. It was adopted for Navy service after modifications recommended by NEDU were implemented.

=== Naval Support Activity Panama City ===
In 1975, NEDU relocated to its current location in Panama City, Florida.

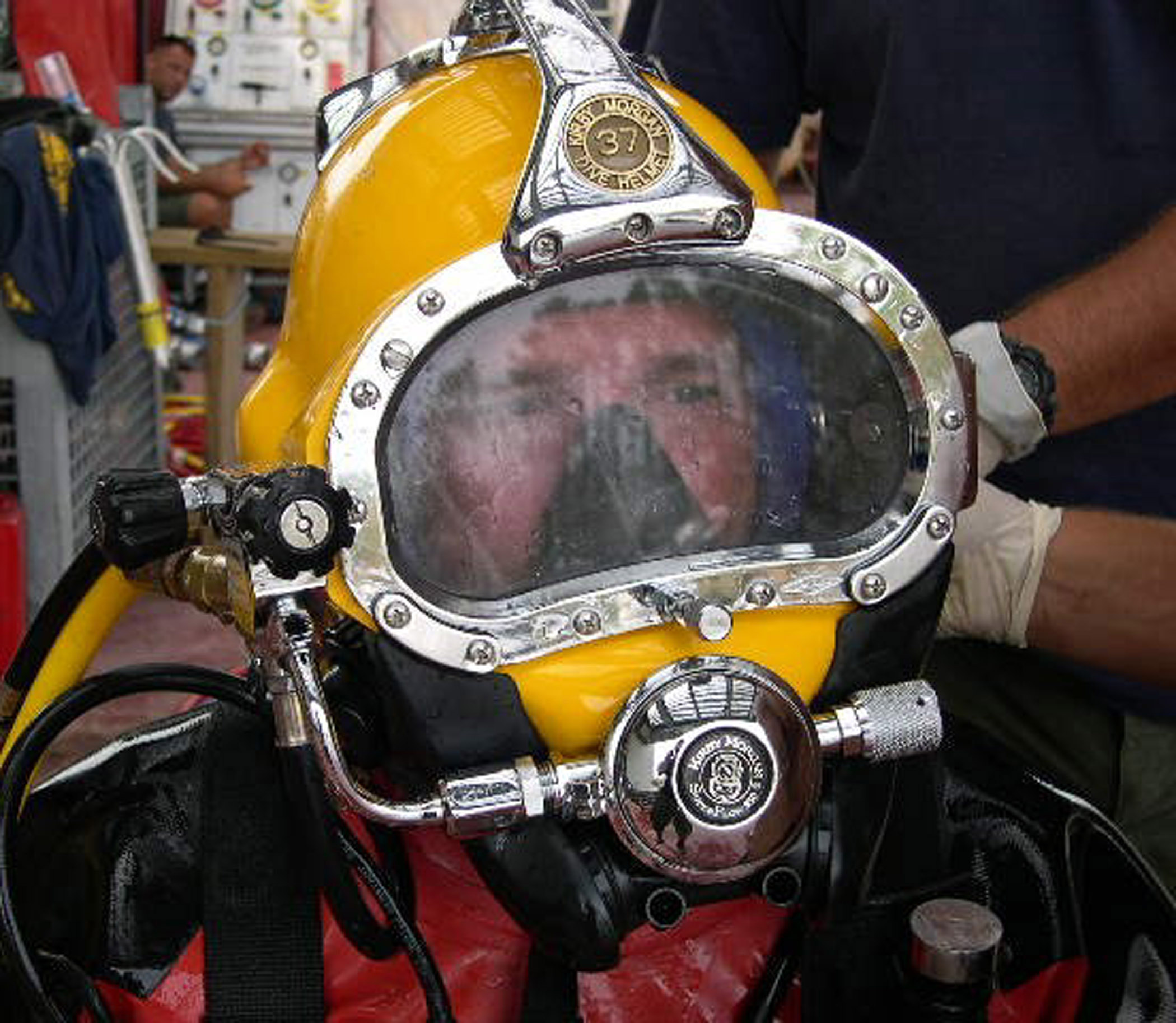
US Navy Diver using Kirby Morgan 37 diving helmet

NEDU began a project to modernize Stillson's MK V surface supplied diving system which had been in service since 1916 in the early 1970s, and developed, tested, and certified the replacement Mark 12 Surface Supplied Diving System which was taken into service in 1985, and eventually its replacement the Mark 21/ Superlight 17 in the 1970s and 1980s, adopted in 1993.

NEDU developed the MK 14 Closed-Circuit Saturation Diving System in the 1970s. This system is used for diving operations from a closed divin bell and a saturation system.

NEDU comprehensively tested and evaluated the MK 11 rebreather in the 1970s.

NEDU conducts at least one saturation dive per year. These dives were used, amongst other things, to evaluate decompression and recompression procedures, equipment, carbon dioxide absorbents, as well as active and passive thermal protection. Many of these tests included ongoing evaluations of commercially available diving equipment.

NEDU evaluated the Jack Browne lightweight mask for shallow water diving on several occasions. The mask was in service from World War II through the late 1970s. By 1978 NEDU determined the mask was no longer suitable for intensive diving operations and it was phased out in the 1980s.

NEDU tested and certified the commercially produced Mk 15 rebreather for use by Navy Special Forces in 1980, and developed new constant oxygen partial pressure decompression tables to use with the it, as standard open circuit tables could not be used. This was followed by evaluation of the Mk 16 rebreather, an upgrade of the Mk 15 with a low magnetic signal suitable for explosive ordnance disposal (EOD) operations.

In 1998, the Naval Medical Research Center's diving biomedical and development group was transferred to NEDU.

In response to the overseas military needs, NEDU focused on warm water diving from 1999 to 2002. This guidance to the Naval Special Warfare community influences operational needs on an ongoing basis.

NEDU divers were essential to the recovery of artifacts from the wreck of the USS Monitor in 2001 and 2002.

In 2002, certification of the Mark 16 Mod 1 rebreather was completed following improvement of systems including, extension of the working limit to 300 feet (91 m), new decompression tables for both nitrogen-oxygen and helium-oxygen diving including new repetitive diving capabilities for helium-oxygen, test of an Emergency Breathing System with communications, the addition of an integrated buoyancy compensation device, and an improved full face mask.

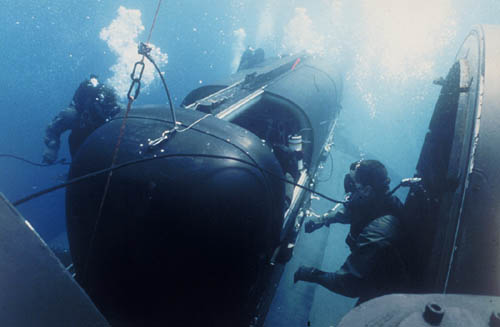
SEALs using SEAL Delivery Vehicle

In 2004, NEDU contributed to operational guidance for diving in harsh contaminated environments.

NEDU has continued research into oxygen toxicity utilizing the US Navy Mark 16 Mod 1.

Development of breathing systems, thermal protection, and decompression procedures for SEAL Delivery Vehicles and the Advanced SEAL Delivery System is ongoing.

In 2011, divers completed a 1,000 fsw saturation dive to evaluate the new Navy's Saturation Fly-Away Diving System (SAT FADS). The SAT FADS was designed in 2006 as a portable replacement of two decommissioned Pigeon-class submarine rescue vessels.

In March 2022, CDR Dustin Cunningham took up his appointment as commanding officer of NEDU.

== Facilities ==
=== Ocean Simulation Facility ===
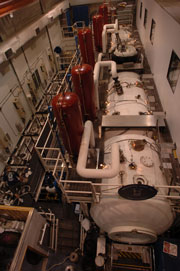
NEDU Ocean Simulation Facility

The Ocean Simulation Facility (OSF) simulates ocean conditions to a maximum pressure equivalent of 2,250 feet (690 m) seawater at any salinity level. The chamber complex consists of a 55,000-US-gallon (210,000 L) wet chamber and five interconnected dry living/working chambers totaling 3,300 cubic feet (93 m^{3}) of space. Wet and dry chamber temperatures can be set from 28 to 104 °F (−2 to 40 °C). Equipped with the latest data acquisition capability, the OSF can accommodate a wide range of complex experiments including diver biomedical studies and testing of humans as well as small submersible vehicles and other machines in the wet chamber. Saturation dives can be performed for more than 30 days of continuous exposure in the OSF. For human and equipment testing underwater over extended periods, divers use the dry chambers as comfortable living quarters, from which they can make diving excursions into the wet chamber. The dry chambers are also capable of altitude simulation studies to heights of 150,000 feet (46,000 m).

=== Experimental test pool ===
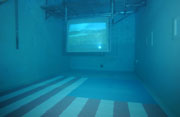
NEDU experimental test pool

The Experimental Test Pool is a 50,000-US-gallon (190,000 L) capacity freshwater tank measuring 15 ft (4.6 m) by 30 ft (9.1 m) by 15 ft (4.6 m) deep, capable of sustaining temperatures from 34 to 105 °F (1 to 41 °C). It is designed and constructed for manned, shallow water testing and for supporting workup dives for the Ocean Simulation Facility. The test pool is supported by a fully instrumented medical and engineering deck, from which the safety of both divers and test equipment can be monitored. The facility can accommodate a wide range of experiments, from biomedical studies of diver thermal and workload conditions to equipment studies of submersible devices. The test pool has a communications suite, full video capability, real-time computerized data acquisition and analysis, and pressure and gas monitoring.

The depth is sufficient to allow divers to maintain an oxygen partial pressure of 1.3 bar on their breathing apparatus while immersed and riding a bicycle ergometer.

=== Environmental chamber ===
NEDU environmental chamber

The Environmental Chamber is capable of simulating a broad range of temperatures from 0 to 130 °F (−18 to 54 °C), humidity from 5 to 95%, and wind velocity from 0 to 20 mph (0 to 32 km/h). The chamber is instrumented to conduct physiological studies and to test various types of equipment.

=== Experimental diving facility ===
NEDU experimental diving facility

The Experimental Diving Facility (EDF) simulates unmanned pressure conditions to 1,640 feet (500 m) sea water and temperatures can be set from 28 to 110 °F (−2 to 43 °C). As a complement to the Ocean Simulation Facility, the EDF is used to conduct unmanned testing and evaluation of diving and hyperbaric chamber systems and components. All diving practices and procedures are tested to determine their safety, conformance to established standards, and operational suitability and limits.

=== Class 100,000 clean room ===
NEDU Class 100,000 clean room

Operated by certified technicians, the Class 100,000 Clean Room performs a variety of cleaning and testing tasks: oxygen cleaning of piping, valves, regulators, tanks, and filters, as well as hydrostatic testing up to 10,000 psi (69,000 kPa). All components used in diving life-support systems are cleaned and certified to meet military standards.

=== Gas analysis lab ===
NEDU gas analysis lab

The gas analysis laboratory is equipped for the precise analysis of gases, and it is used to evaluate diving-related problems such as offgassing and contaminant control. The laboratory's analytical capabilities include gas chromatography, mass spectrometry, and infrared spectroscopy. The facility is currently used to develop reliable and rapid screening methods and analyzers for the Fleet.

=== Cardiopulmonary lab ===
The cardiopulmonary laboratory consists of machines that perform a variety of respiratory function tests and aerobic performance measurements that are often recorded before and after pressure and/or thermal exposure.

=== Library ===
The NEDU Library contains over 120,000 documents on diving medicine, engineering, and history from around the world. Many of the NEDU publications have been scanned and are available online at the Rubicon Research Repository. Other articles can be found in the Duke University Medical Center Archive finding aids of the Undersea and Hyperbaric Medical Society library collection.

== Personnel ==
The 120 person NEDU Team includes highly qualified and experienced military divers with a combined 1,000 man-years of diving experience: Sea-Air-Land (SEAL), Explosive Ordnance Disposal (EOD), Salvage, Saturation, Seabee, Diving Officer, and Diving Medical Officer (DMO), Ph.D. scientists, engineers, various science-degreed professionals and support personnel.

== In media ==
- "The Mystery of the Bends," a 1992 episode of the PBS television series Return to the Sea, includes a profile of the United States Navy Experimental Diving Unit.
