= LeCroy Corporation =

American manufacturer of test equipment

Teledyne LeCroy
- Formerly: LeCroy Research Systems; LeCroy Corporation
- Company type: Subsidiary
- Industry: Electronics
- Founded: 1964; 62 years ago
- Founder: Walter LeCroy
- Fate: Acquired by Teledyne Technologies
- Headquarters: Chestnut Ridge, New York, U.S.
- Products: Electronic measurement equipment
- Parent: Teledyne Technologies
- Website: teledynelecroy.com

Teledyne LeCroy is an American manufacturer of oscilloscopes, protocol analyzers and other test equipment. LeCroy became a subsidiary of Teledyne Technologies in 2012.

== History ==
Former LeCroy Corporation logo

LeCroy Corporation was founded in 1964 (as LeCroy Research Systems) by Walter LeCroy.

The company was privately held until its public offering in 1995.

In September 2004, LeCroy purchased Computer Access Technology Corporation (CATC).

On May 29, 2012, Teledyne Technologies Incorporated and LeCroy Corporation jointly announced that they had entered into a definitive agreement of the acquisition of LeCroy Corporation by Teledyne and the formation of Teledyne LeCroy as a wholly owned subsidiary.

On April 7, 2016, Teledyne LeCroy announced it had acquired Frontline Test Equipment, Inc., a provider of wireless protocol analysis test tools.

On April 13, 2016, Teledyne LeCroy announced it had entered into an agreement to acquire Quantum Data, Inc., a manufacturer of video test tools, signal generators, and protocol analyzers.

== Media gallery ==
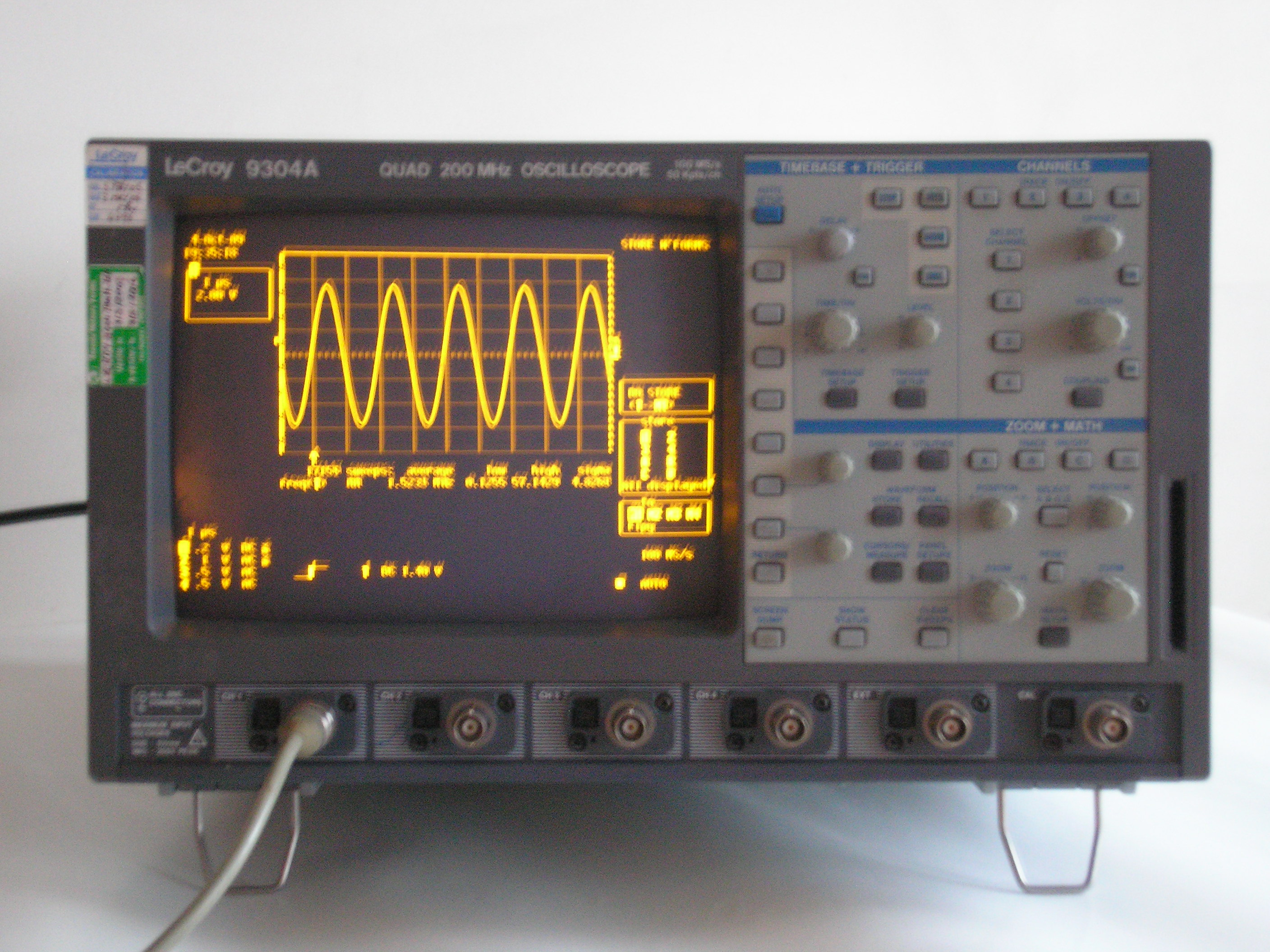
LeCroy 9304A oscilloscope

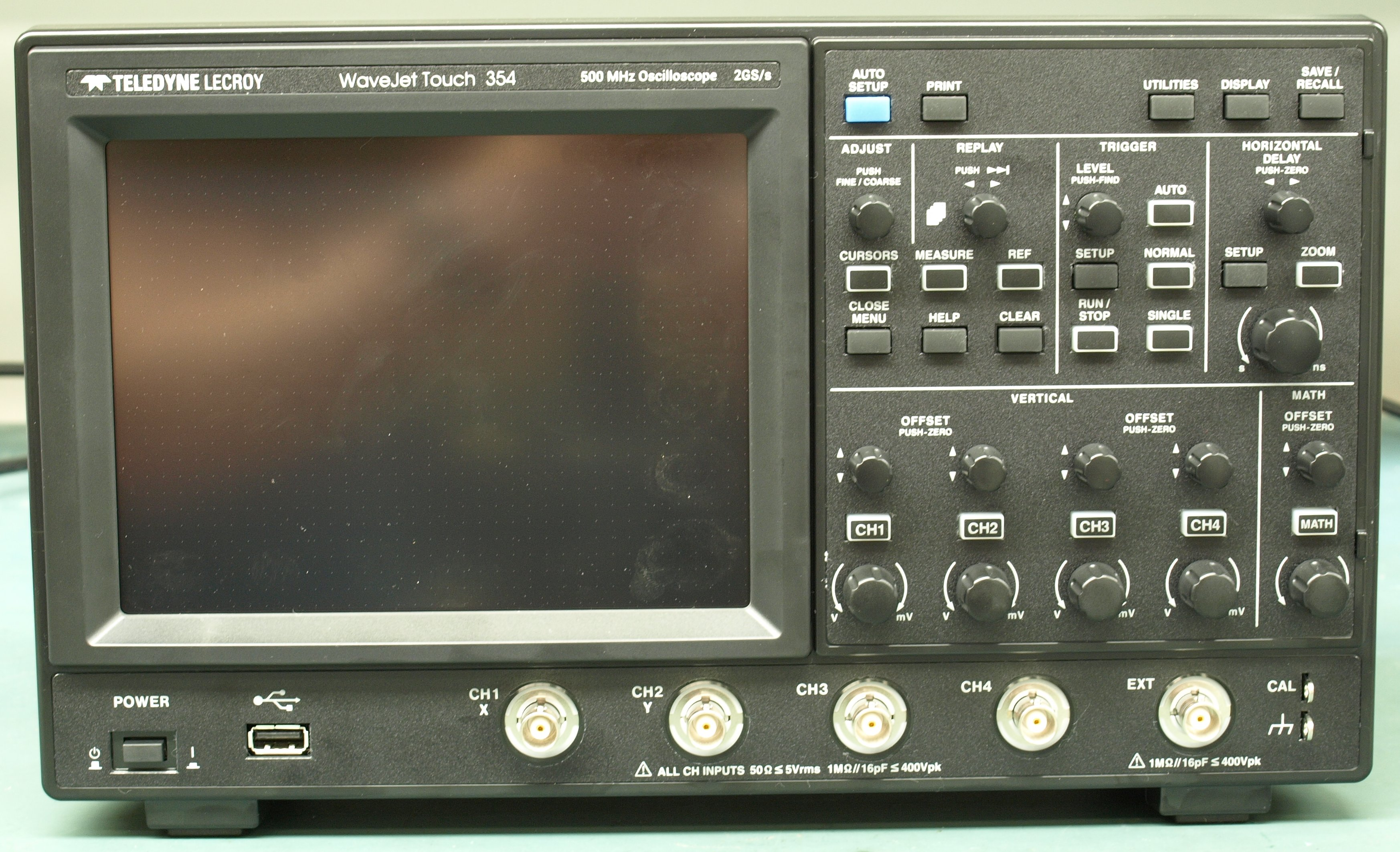
LeCroy Wavejet Touch 354 oscilloscope

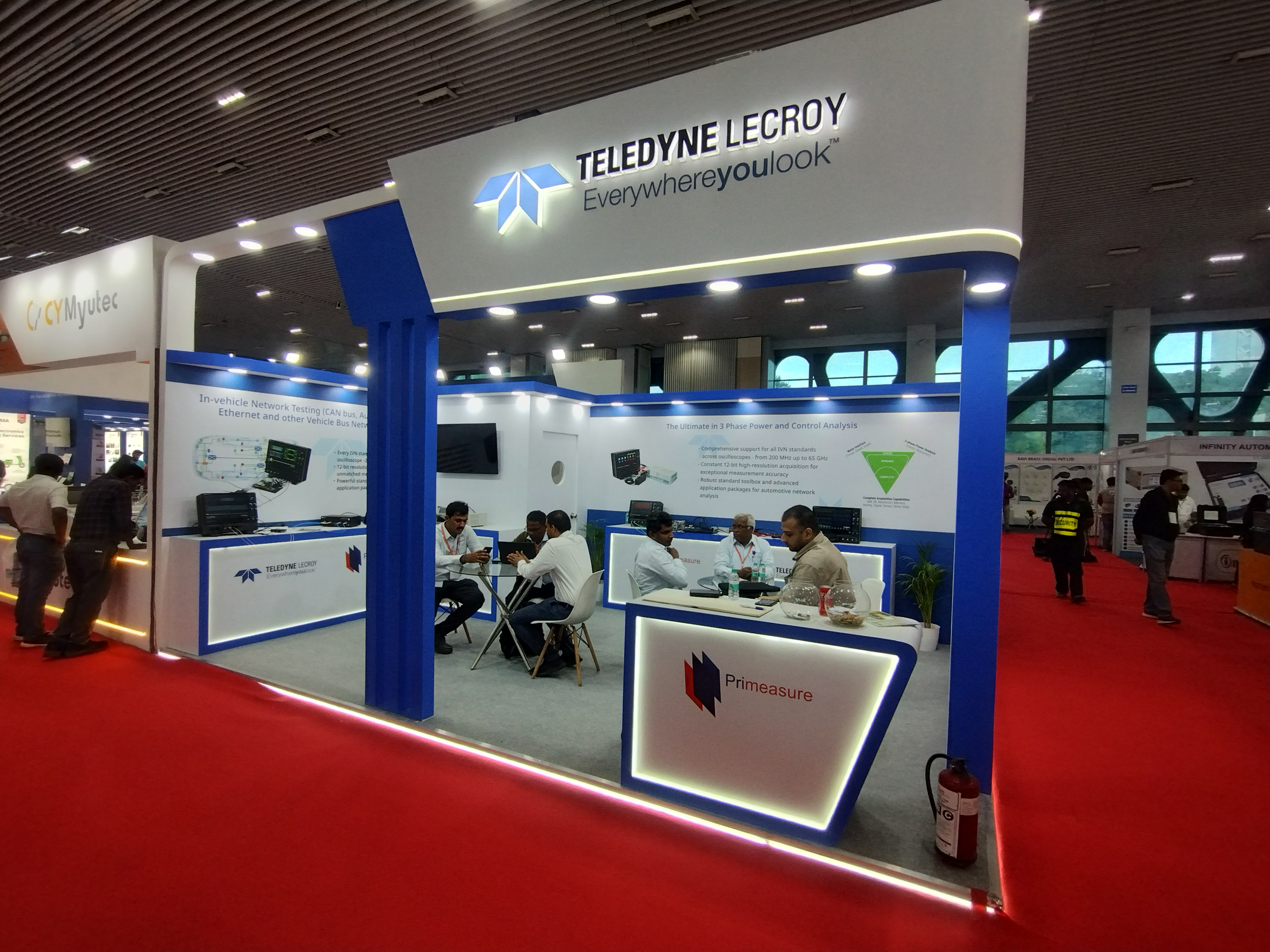
Teledyne LeCroy at Auto EV Bharat 4.0, KTPO Exhibition centre, Bangalore (2025)
