= Cyrus W. Cole =

American Navy officer

Cyrus Williard Cole
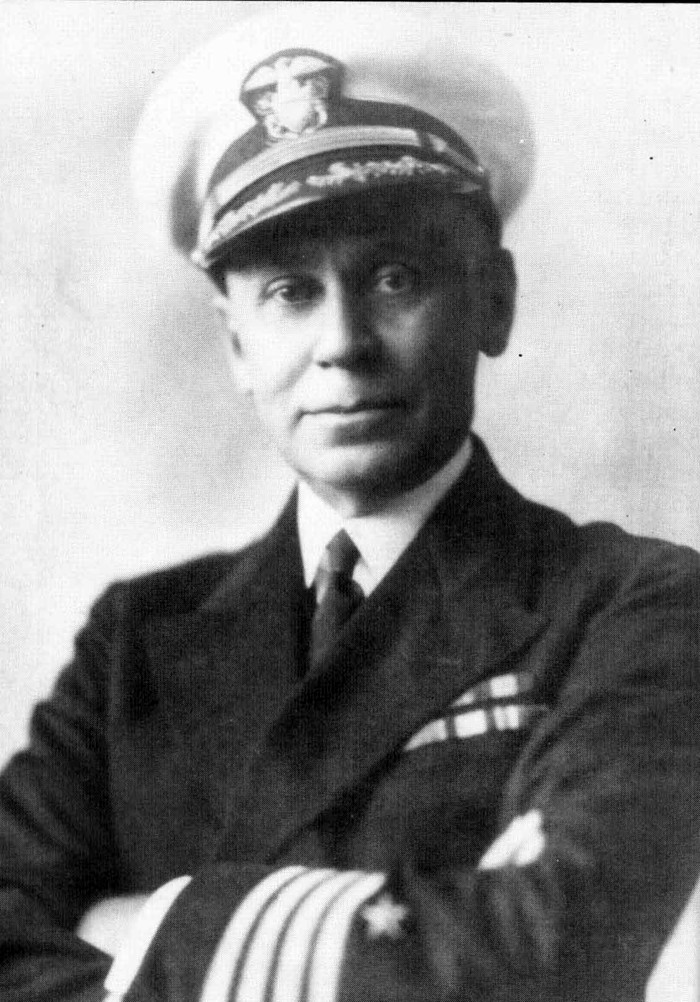
- Born: June 21, 1876; Marshall, Michigan, U.S.
- Died: July 29, 1952 (aged 76); San Diego, California, U.S.
- Relatives: Capt. Cyrus C. Cole, USN (son)
- Military career
- Allegiance: United States of America
- Branch: United States Navy
- Service years: 1899–1940
- Rank: Rear Admiral
- Commands: Portsmouth Navy Yard; USS West Virginia
- Conflicts: Spanish–American War; Philippine–American War; World War I
- Awards: Navy Cross; Distinguished Service Medal

Cyrus Willard Cole (21 June 1876 – 29 July 1952) was a highly decorated United States Navy officer with the rank of rear admiral. While commandant of Portsmouth Navy Yard, Cole served as the officer in charge of the rescue and salvage operations of the sunken submarine Squalus, which accidentally sank off the Isle of Shoals while diving in testing trials on May 23, 1939.

== Early years ==
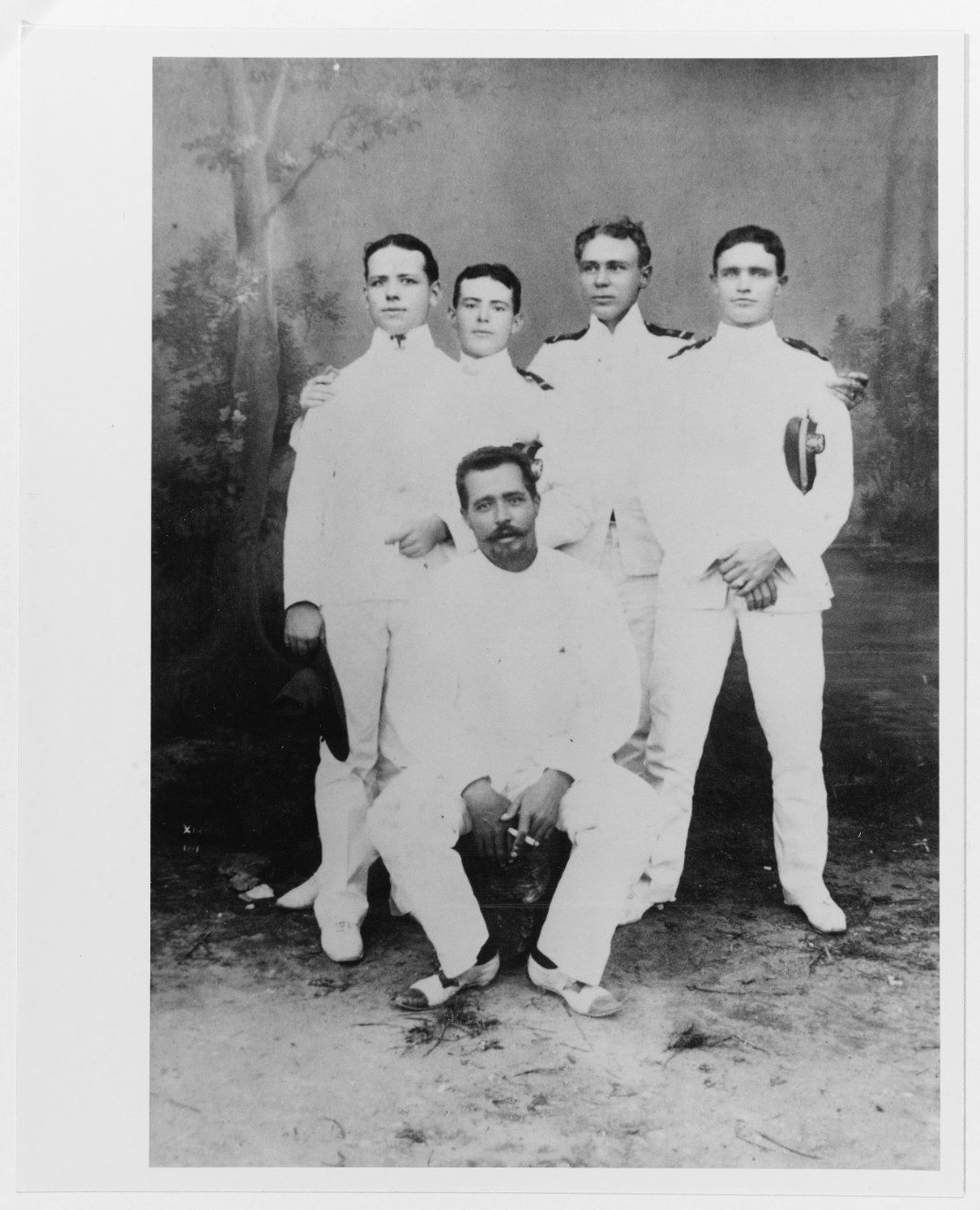
Cole (third from left) with Officers at Iloilo, Philippine Islands, January 1900.

Cole was born in Marshall, Michigan. He gained admittance to the United States Naval Academy and graduated in 1899. After two years of service aboard the protected cruiser Baltimore and the gunboat Princeton, Cole was transferred to the battleship Kearsarge. Between 1905 and 1906 Cole served with a recruiting party, and then was transferred to the battleship Ohio in April 1907. Later, in November 1909, Cole returned to Annapolis, where he taught navigation.

After about two years at Annapolis, Cole transferred to the United States Asiatic Fleet, where he commanded its Torpedo Flotilla from October 1911 until August 1914. Later he served at the United States Naval Training Station at Great Lakes, Illinois, and then served as the executive officer of the battleship Rhode Island. During World War I, Cole captained two United States Naval transports, the store ship Pastores and the troop transport President Grant. In recognition of his service, Cole was awarded the Navy Cross along with a letter of commendation.

== Postwar career ==
After the end of World War I, Cole served as an aide to the commander of the Newport News Division of the United States Naval Cruiser and Transport Force, after which he was ordered to become the recruiting inspector for the Western Division in November 1919. Cole then commanded the receiving ship the former protected cruiser San Francisco between the years 1921 and 1923, and both of the hospital ships Mercy and Relief.

After giving up command of the Relief, Cole transferred to the Naval War College to receive instruction in June 1923. In San Francisco, on June 7, 1924, Cole became assistant commandant of the Twelfth Naval District and was in that duty until January 1926, when he was ordered to captain the scout cruiser Omaha. In September 1927, Cole was ordered to take command of the Naval Training Station at San Diego, at which he served until June 1930, when he gained the captaincy of the battleship West Virginia. After this command Cole then served as director of fleet training for the Navy Department from February 1932 until May 1934, when he took command of the U.S. Fleet's Submarine Force.

Cole was assigned on June 15, 1936, as the commandant of the Portsmouth Navy Yard. While commandant, Cole served as the officer in charge of the rescue and salvage operations of the sunken submarine Squalus, which accidentally sank off the Isle of Shoals while diving in testing trials on May 23, 1939. Cole was awarded the Distinguished Service Medal for his successful oversight of this crucial operation.

The following year after the recovery of the Squalus, Cole was transferred the Retired List on July 1, 1940, with the rank of rear admiral.

He died on July 29, 1952, in San Diego, California, and is buried at Fort Rosecrans National Cemetery together with his wife Julianna Busby Cole (1878–1953). Their son, Captain Cyrus Churchill Cole, USN (1913–1967), served as a submarine commander in the Pacific during World War II and was also awarded with the Navy Cross in 1944.

== Decorations ==
Here is the decoration list of Rear Admiral Cole:

| Navy Cross |
| Navy Distinguished Service Medal |
| Navy Spanish Campaign Medal |
| Philippine Campaign Medal |
| World War I Victory Medal with Overseas clasp |
| American Defense Service Medal |
