= Analyser =

Tool used to analyse data

An analyser (British English) or analyzer (American English; see spelling differences) is a tool used to analyse and to use solutions for data. For example, a gas analyser tool is used to analyse gases. It examines the given data and tries to find patterns and relationships. An analyser can be a piece of hardware or software.

Autoanalysers are machines that perform their work with little human involvement.

== Operation ==
Analysis can be done directly on samples or the analyser can process data acquired from a remote sensor. The source of samples for automatic sampling is commonly some kind of industrial process. Analysers that are connected to a process and conduct automatic sampling, can be called online (or on-line) analysers or sometimes inline (or in-line) analysers. For inline analysis, a sensor can be placed in a process vessel or stream of flowing material. Another method of online analysis is allowing a sample stream to flow from the process equipment into an analyser, sometimes conditioning the sample stream e.g., by reducing pressure or changing the sample temperature. Many analysers are not designed to withstand high pressure. Such sampling is typically for fluids (either liquids or gases). If the sample stream is not substantially modified by the analyser, it can be returned to the process. Otherwise, the sample stream is discarded; for example, if reagents were added.

Pressure can be lowered by a pressure reducing valve. Such valves may be used to control the flow rate to the online analyser. The temperature of a hot sample may be lowered by use of an online sample cooler. Analysis can be done periodically (for example, every 15 minutes), or continuously. For periodic sampling, valves (or other devices) can be switched open to allow a fluid sample stream to flow to the analyser and shut when not sampling.

Some methods of inline analysis are so simple, such as electrical conductivity or pH, the instruments are usually not even called analysers. Salinity determined from simple online analysis is often determined from a conductivity measurement where the output signal is calibrated in terms of salinity concentration (for example ppm of NaCl). Various types of other analyses can be devised. Physical properties can include electrical conductivity (or effectively electrical resistivity), refractive index, and radioactivity measurement. Simple processes that use inline electrical conductivity determination are water purification processes which test how effectively salts have been removed from the output water. Electrical conductivity variations include cation and anion conductivity. Chromatography such as ion chromatography or HPLC often tests the output stream continuously by measuring electrical conductivity, particularly cation or anion conductivity, refractive index, colorimetry or ultraviolet/visible absorbance at a certain wavelength. InlineOnline and offline analysers are available for other types of analytes. Many of these add reagents to the samples or sample streams.

== Types of analysers ==
- Automated analyser
- Breathalyzer (breath analyser)
- Bus analyser
- Differential analyser – early analogue computer
- Electron microprobe
- Lexical analyser
- Logic analyser
- Network analyser
- Protocol analyser (packet sniffer)
- Quadrupole mass analyser
- Spectrum analyser
- Vector signal analyser
