= Europe–Korea Foundation =

The Europe–Korea Foundation (EKF) is the philanthropic arm of the European Union Chamber of Commerce in Korea (EUCCK). It was established on 9 May 2001 under approval No. 384 by South Korea's Minister of Foreign Affairs and Trade (MOFAT). The foundation is an NGO and is a separate entity, financially independent from the EUCCK.

As a public foundation, the focus of the work of EKF is on improving relations between Europe and the Korean peninsula. EKF undertakes a variety of corporate social responsibility programs, cultural exchanges, sports events, training seminars and other projects promoting inter-Korean understanding and peace. EKF also support South Korean charity organizations.

In addition, EKF provides scholarships for Korean students who wish to study at universities all throughout the European Union. In 2008, ten students received EKF support to study in Europe.
