= Protocol analyzer =

Tool for analyzing signals and data traffic

A protocol analyzer is a tool (hardware or software) used to capture and analyze signals and data traffic over a communication channel. Such a channel varies from a local computer bus to a satellite link, that provides a means of communication using a standard communication protocol (networked or point-to-point). Each type of communication protocol has a different tool to collect and analyze signals and data.

Specific types of protocol analyzers include:

- A telecom network protocol analyzer
- A network packet analyzer such as Wireshark
- A bus analyzer
- An IP load tester
