= Barleben =

- Municipality
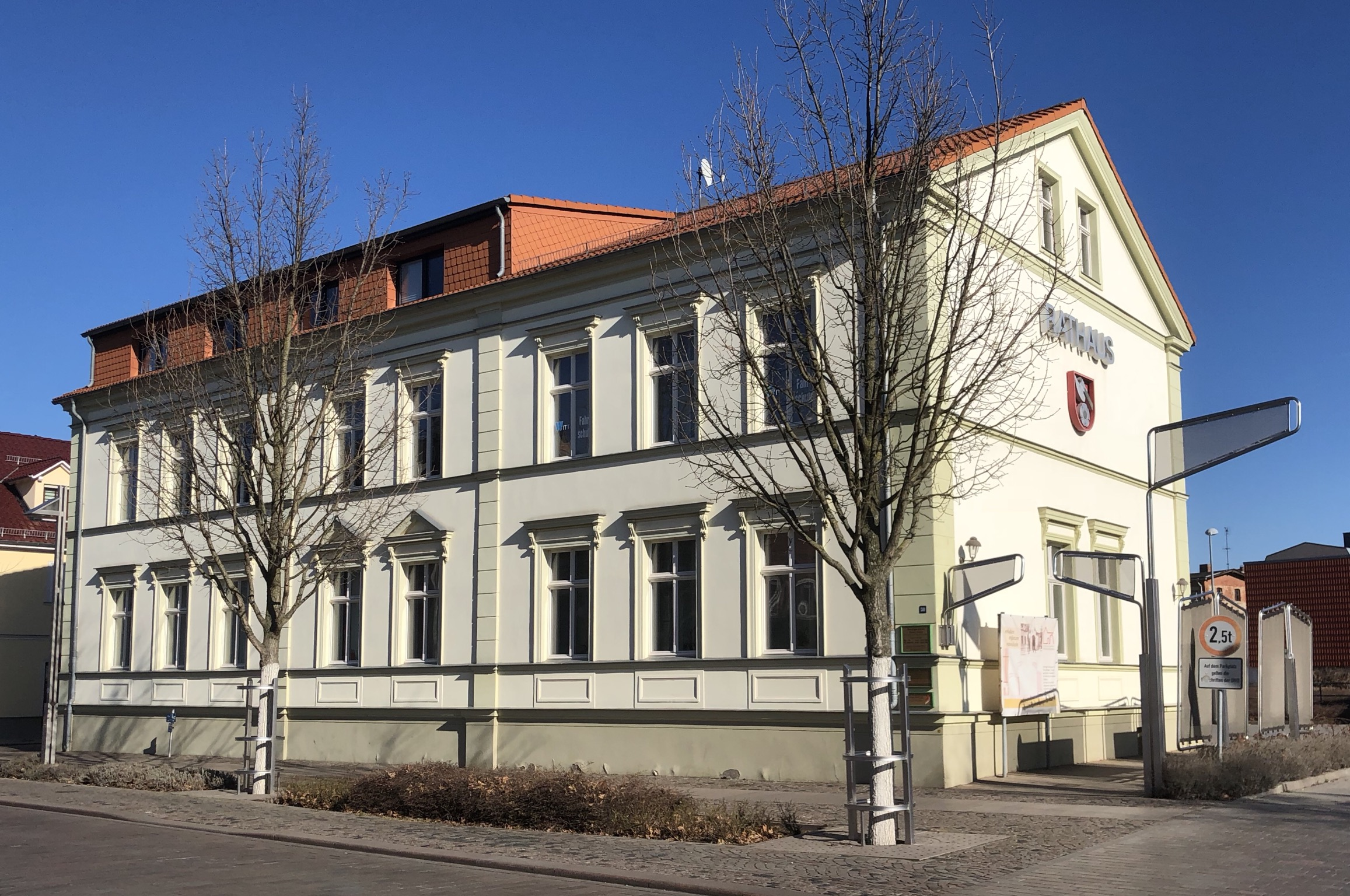

- Coat of arms

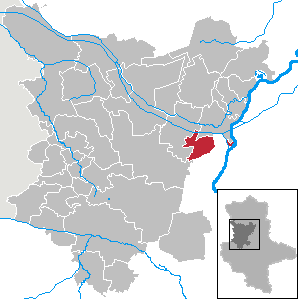
- Location of Barleben within Börde district
- Interactive map of Barleben
- Location within Germany Location within Saxony-Anhalt
- Coordinates: 52°12′N 11°38′E
- Country: Germany
- State: Saxony-Anhalt
- District: Börde

Government
  - Mayor (2018–25): Frank Nase (CDU)

Area
  - Total: 29.73 km^{2} (11.48 sq mi)
- Elevation: 44 m (144 ft)

Population (2025-12-31)
  - Total: 9,170
  - Density: 308/km^{2} (799/sq mi)
- Time zone: UTC+01:00 (CET)
  - Summer (DST): UTC+02:00 (CEST)
- Postal codes: 39179
- Dialling codes: 039203
- Vehicle registration: BK
- Website: www.barleben.de

Barleben is a municipality in the Börde district in Saxony-Anhalt, Germany. It is situated approximately 8 km north of Magdeburg.

== Twin towns — sister cities ==
Barleben is twinned with:

- Viimsi Parish, Estonia
