= Oliver F. Naquin =

Oliver Francis Naquin
- Born: March 24, 1904; New Orleans, Louisiana, U.S.
- Died: November 13, 1989 (aged 85); Malcolm Grow Medical Center, Andrews Air Force Base, Maryland, U.S.
- Burial place: Arlington National Cemetery
- Military career
- Allegiance: United States
- Branch: United States Navy
- Service years: 1925–1955
- Rank: Rear Admiral
- Nickname: Nake
- Commands: USS Squalus
- Conflicts: World War II: Battle of Coral Sea; Battle of Midway; Battle of Tassafaronga
- Awards: Bronze Star
- Other work: Military Assistance Advisory Group

Rear Admiral Oliver Francis Naquin, United States Navy (March 24, 1904 – November 13, 1989) was born in New Orleans, and was a 1925 graduate of the United States Naval Academy. He was one of 33 men rescued by the McCann Rescue Chamber when the submarine USS Squalus sank in 240 feet of water during routine sea trials in the Atlantic Ocean off Portsmouth, New Hampshire, on May 23, 1939, and was rescued in a two-day rescue operation.

== USS Squalus disaster ==
Twenty-six men (one officer, Ensign Joseph H. Patterson; twenty-three enlisted men; and two civilian technicians, Donald M. Smith and Charles M. Wood) were trapped in a flooded aft compartment and died. The remaining 32 naval personnel and a third civilian, naval architect Harold C. Preble, spent up to 39 hours in the sunken vessel before they were brought to the surface by the McCann Rescue Chamber which was used for the first time. Survivors of the USS Squalus were brought up in four trips as the diving bell rode a cable attached to the forward escape hatch of the submarine. A naval board of inquiry concluded that “a mechanical failure in the operating gear of the engine induction valve,” had caused flooding of the aft compartment. The USS Squalus was later salvaged, repaired and returned to sea as the renamed USS Sailfish, receiving credit for sinking seven enemy vessels in World War II.

== World War II ==
Naquin also was a survivor of the attack on Pearl Harbor while aboard the battleship USS California, which sank in shallow water after being struck a bomb and two torpedoes in the Japanese attack on December 7, 1941. During World War II, he served as navigator of the heavy cruiser USS New Orleans in the battles of the Coral Sea and Midway. At the Battle of Tassafaronga on November 30, 1942, the cruiser was struck by a Japanese torpedo, which detonated the ship's forward magazines and gasoline tanks, and the ensuing explosion severed 150 ft of her bow forward of turret #2. The severed bow, including turret #1, swung around the port side and crushed several holes in the New Orleans's hull before it sank at the stern and damaged the port inboard propeller. Naquin guided the ship to Tulagi Harbor, arriving near daybreak on December 1, 1942, for repairs and was awarded a Bronze Star for his role in saving the vessel.

Naquin played two roles in the sinking of the USS Indianapolis. His first role as Port Director at Guam was to not inform Capt. Charles Butler McVay III of enemy submarine activity along the route from Guam to Leyte and to refuse a request for escort, making this the first time a cruiser had traveled the Philippine Sea unescorted. The trip was approximately 1,500 miles; when the USS Indianapolis sunk it was 300 miles from land. The second role Naquin played was to not follow through on being notified of a distress call from a ship in the approximate area where the USS Indianapolis would be, even once he was made aware that the USS Indianapolis was seriously overdue. His justification was that it was Navy policy to confirm a distress call and his Office sent out a reply message but did not get a return message. The reason for this policy was that the Navy wanted to be sure that the call was not an enemy trap. There were many high-ranking officers who had knowledge of the route and schedule of the USS Indianapolis voyage from Tinian to Guam to Leyte and were anticipating word of the ship's arrival in Leyte. The survivors were found about 71 hours after the sinking by a pilot on routine patrol, who spotted them by accident. There are many scenarios in which, under proper Navy procedure, the survivors could have been found 24 hours earlier, and as soon as 24 hours after the sinking of the ship, which would have been 48 hours earlier. It took another two days for everybody to be rescued. The crew consisted of 1,196 young men in their late teens and early twenties. Approximately 300 men went down with the ship and 317 survived, with approximately 550 to 600 lost at sea. The 24- or 48-eight-hour difference could have saved hundreds of lives; if an escort with submarine detection capability had been present, all might have been saved.

== Post-war ==
Naquin held several high staff positions after the war and was the chief naval officer in the Military Assistance Advisory Group in Britain, at his retirement on July 1, 1955, after a 34-year career in the Navy. He lived in Arlington, Virginia.

He died on November 13, 1989, at age 85, of pancreatic cancer at Andrews Air Force Base Hospital and was buried in Section 5 of Arlington National Cemetery.
