= Bus analyzer =

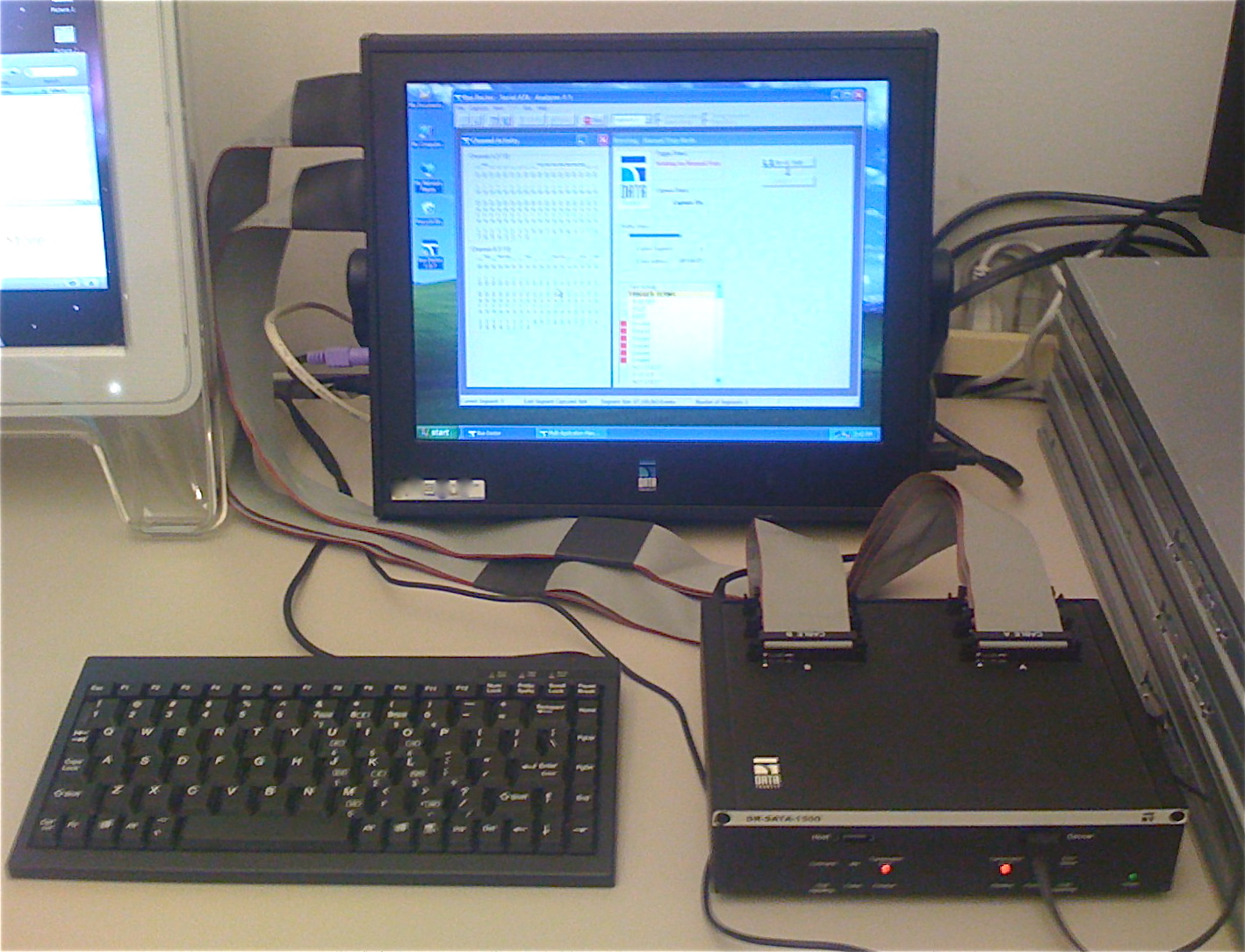
A typical bus analyzer: this one has an adaptor pod to allow it to interface to Serial ATA devices.

A bus analyzer is a type of a protocol analysis tool, used for capturing and analyzing communication data across a specific interface bus, usually embedded in a hardware system. The bus analyzer functionality helps design, test and validation engineers to check, test, debug and validate their designs throughout the design cycles of a hardware-based product. It also helps in later phases of a product life cycle, in examining communication interoperability between systems and between components, and clarifying hardware support concerns.

A bus analyzer is designed for use with specific parallel or serial bus architectures. Though the term bus analyzer implies a physical communication and interface that is being analyzed, it is sometimes used interchangeably with the term protocol analyzer or Packet Analyzer, and may be used also for analysis tools for Wireless interfaces like wireless LAN (like Wi-Fi), PAN (like Bluetooth, Wireless USB), and other, though these technologies do not have a “Wired” Bus.

The bus analyzer monitors and captures the bus communication data, decodes and analyses it and displays the data and analysis reports to the user. It is essentially a logic analyzer with some additional knowledge of the underlying bus traffic characteristics. One of the key differences between a bus analyzer and a logic analyzer is notably its ability to filter and extract only relevant traffic that occurs on the analyzed bus. Some advanced logic analyzers present data storage qualification options that also allow to filter bus traffic, enabling bus analyzer-like features.

Some key differentiators between bus and logic analyzers are:

1. Cost: Logic analyzers usually carry higher prices than bus analyzers. The converse of this fact is that a logic analyzer can be used with a variety of bus architectures, whereas a bus analyzer is only good with one architecture.
2. Targeted Capabilities and Preformatting of data: A bus analyzer can be designed to provide very specific context for data coming in from the bus. Analyzers for serial buses like USB for example take serial data that arrives as a serial stream of binary 1s and 0s and displays it as logical packets differentiated by chirp, headers, payload etc...
3. Ease of use: While a general purpose logic analyzer, may support multiple busses and interfaces, a bus analyzer is designed for a specific physical interface and usually allows the user to quickly connect the probing hardware to the bus that is tested, saving time and effort.

From a user's perspective, a (greatly) simplified viewpoint may be that developers who want the most complete and most targeted capabilities for a single bus architecture may be best served with a bus analyzer, while users who work with several protocols in parallel may be better served with a Logic Analyzer that is less costly than several different bus analyzers and enables them to learn a single user interface vs several.

Analyzers are now available for virtually all existing computer and embedded bus standards and form factors such as PCI Express, DDR, USB, PCI, CompactPCI, PMC, VMEbus, CANbus and LINbus, etc. Bus analyzers are used in the Avionics industry to analyze MIL-STD-1553, ARINC 429, AFDX, and other avionics databus protocols. Other bus analyzers are also used in the mass storage industry to analyze popular data transfer protocols between computers and drives. These cover popular data buses like NVMe, SATA, SAS, ATA/PI, SCSI, etc. These devices are typically connected in series between the host computer and the target drive, where they 'snoop' traffic on the bus, capture it and present it in human-readable format.

== Bus and protocol exerciser ==
For many bus architectures like PCI Express, PCI, SAS, SATA, and USB, engineers also use a "Bus Exerciser" or “Protocol Exerciser”. Such exercisers can emulate partial or full communication stacks which comply with the specific bus communication standard, thus allowing engineers to surgically control and generate bus traffic to test, debug and validate their designs.

These devices make it possible to also generate bad bus traffic as well as good so that the device error recovery systems can be tested. They are also often used to verify compliance with the standard to ensure interoperability of devices since they can reproduce known scenarios in a repeatable way.

Exercisers are usually used in conjunction with analyzers, so the engineer gets full visibility of the communication data captured on the bus. Some exercisers are designed as stand-alone systems while others are combined into the same systems used for analysis.

PCI Express 2.0 bus exerciser testing an add-in card

== See also ==
- JTAG (boundary scan)
