= USS Sailfish (SS-192) =

Sargo-class submarine of the US Navy

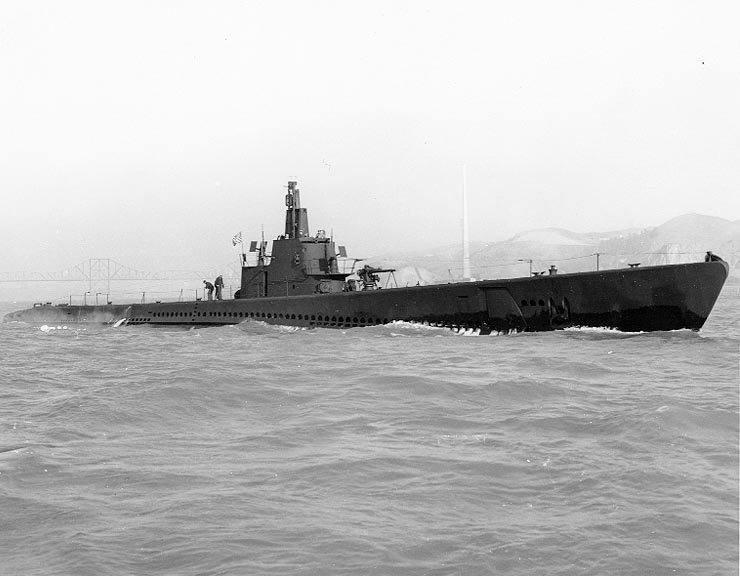
- USS Sailfish (SS-192), off the Mare Island Navy Yard, Vallejo, California, 13 April 1943

History

United States
- Name: USS Squalus
- Namesake: Squalus
- Builder: Portsmouth Naval Shipyard; Kittery, Maine
- Laid down: 18 October 1937
- Launched: 14 September 1938
- Sponsored by: Mrs. Thomas C. Hart
- Commissioned: 1 March 1939
- Decommissioned: 15 November 1939
- Fate: Sunk and salvaged
- Raised: 13 September 1939
- Renamed: USS Sailfish, 9 February 1940
- Namesake: Sailfish
- Commissioned: 15 May 1940
- Decommissioned: 27 October 1945
- Stricken: 30 April 1948
- Honors and awards: Nine battle stars for World War II; Presidential Unit Citation, tenth patrol
- Fate: Sold for scrap

General characteristics
- Class & type: Sargo-class composite diesel-hydraulic and diesel-electric submarine
- Displacement: 1,450 long tons (1,473 t) standard, surfaced; 2,350 long tons (2,388 t) submerged
- Length: 310 ft 6 in (94.64 m)
- Beam: 26 ft 10 in (8.18 m)
- Draft: 16 ft 7.5 in (5.067 m)
- Installed power: 5,500 hp (4,100 kW) surfaced; 2,740 hp (2,040 kW) submerged
- Propulsion: 4 × General Motors Model 16-248 V16 diesel engines (two hydraulic-drive, two driving electrical generators); 2 × 126-cell Sargo batteries; 4 × high-speed General Electric electric motors with reduction gears; 2 × shafts
- Speed: 21 kn (24 mph; 39 km/h) surfaced; 8.75 kn (10.07 mph; 16.21 km/h) submerged
- Range: 11,000 nmi (13,000 mi; 20,000 km) at 10 kn (12 mph; 19 km/h)
- Endurance: 48 hours at 2 kn (2.3 mph; 3.7 km/h) submerged
- Test depth: 250 ft (76 m)
- Complement: 5 officers, 54 enlisted
- Armament: 8 × 21 inch (533 mm) torpedo tubes (four forward, four aft; 24 Mark 14 torpedoes); 1 × 3 in (76 mm)/50 cal deck gun; 4 × machine guns

USS Sailfish (SS-192) was a Sargo-class submarine of the United States Navy, originally named Squalus. As Squalus, the submarine sank off the coast of New Hampshire during test dives on 23 May 1939. The sinking drowned 26 crew members, but an ensuing rescue operation, using the McCann Rescue Chamber for the first time, saved the lives of the remaining 33 aboard. Squalus was salvaged in late 1939 and recommissioned as Sailfish in May 1940.

As Sailfish, the vessel conducted numerous patrols in the Pacific War during World War II, earning nine battle stars. She was decommissioned in October 1945 and later scrapped. Her conning tower is on display at Portsmouth Naval Shipyard in Kittery, Maine.

== Construction and commissioning ==
Squalus's keel was laid on 18 October 1937 by the Portsmouth Navy Yard in Kittery, Maine, the only ship of the United States Navy named for the squalus, a type of shark. She was launched on 14 September 1938, sponsored by Mrs. Thomas C. Hart, wife of Admiral Thomas C. Hart, and commissioned on 1 March 1939 with Lieutenant Oliver F. Naquin in command.

== Sinking of Squalus and recommissioning as Sailfish ==
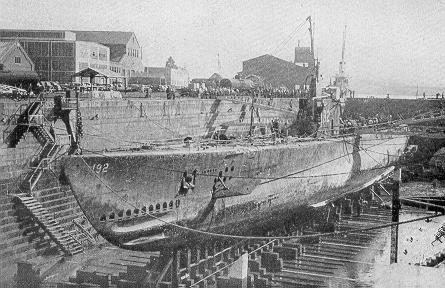
SS-192 in drydock after salvage

On 12 May 1939, following a yard overhaul, Squalus began a series of test dives off Portsmouth, New Hampshire. After successfully completing 18 dives, she went down again off the Isles of Shoals on the morning of 23 May at 42°53′N 70°37′W. Failure of the main induction valve (the means of letting in fresh air when on the surface) caused the flooding of the aft torpedo room, both engine rooms, and the crew's quarters, drowning 26 men immediately. Quick action by the crew prevented the other compartments from flooding. Squalus bottomed in 243 ft (74 m) of water.

Squalus was initially located by her sister boat, Sculpin. The two submarines communicated using a telephone marker buoy until the cable parted. Divers from the submarine rescue ship Falcon began rescue operations under the direction of the salvage and rescue expert Lieutenant Commander Charles B. "Swede" Momsen, using the new McCann Rescue Chamber. The senior medical officer for the operations was Dr. Charles Wesley Shilling. Overseen by researcher Albert R. Behnke, the divers used recently developed heliox diving schedules and successfully avoided the cognitive impairment symptoms associated with such deep dives, thereby confirming Behnke's theory of nitrogen narcosis. The divers rescued all 33 survivors (32 crew members and a civilian) on board the sunken submarine. Four enlisted divers, Chief Machinist's Mate William Badders, Chief Boatswain's Mate Orson L. Crandall, Chief Metalsmith James H. McDonald, and Chief Torpedoman John Mihalowski, were awarded the Medal of Honor for their work during the rescue and subsequent salvage. The successful rescue of the Squalus survivors is in marked contrast to the loss of HMS Thetis in Liverpool Bay in England just a week later, with four survivors from 104 people aboard.

The naval authorities felt raising Squalus was important, as she incorporated a succession of new design features. With a thorough investigation of why she sank, more confidence could be placed in the new construction, or alteration of existing designs could be undertaken when cheapest and most efficient to do so. Furthermore, given similar previous accidents in Sturgeon and Snapper (indeed, in S-5, as far back as 1920), determining a cause was necessary.

The Squalus salvage unit was commanded by Rear Admiral Cyrus W. Cole, commandant of the Portsmouth Naval Shipyard, who supervised salvage officer Lieutenant Floyd A. Tusler from the Construction Corps. Cole also requested experienced Commander Henry Hartley as his technical aide. Tusler's plan was to lift the submarine in three stages to prevent it from rising too quickly, out of control, with one end up, in which case the likelihood of it sinking again would be high. For 50 days, divers worked to pass cables underneath the submarine and attach pontoons for buoyancy. On 13 July 1939, the stern was raised successfully, but when the men attempted to free the bow from the hard blue clay, the vessel began to rise far too quickly, slipping its cables. Ascending vertically, the submarine broke the surface, and 30 feet (10 m) of the bow reached into the air for not more than ten seconds before she sank once again all the way to the bottom. Momsen said of the mishap, "pontoons were smashed, hoses cut and I might add, hearts were broken." After 20 more days of preparation, with a radically redesigned pontoon and cable arrangement, the next lift was successful, as were two further operations. Squalus was towed into Portsmouth on 13 September, and decommissioned on 15 November. A total of 628 dives had been made in rescue and salvage operations.

== Operational history of Sailfish ==
Renamed Sailfish on 9 February 1940, she became the first boat of the U.S. Navy named for the sailfish. After reconditioning, repair, and overhaul, she was recommissioned on 15 May 1940 with Lieutenant Commander Morton C. Mumma Jr. (Annapolis, class of 1930) in command.

With refit completed in mid-September, Sailfish departed Portsmouth on 16 January 1941 and headed for the Pacific. Transiting the Panama Canal, she arrived at Pearl Harbor in early March, after refueling at San Diego. The submarine then sailed west to Manila where she joined the Asiatic Fleet until the attack on Pearl Harbor.

During the Pacific War, the captain of the renamed boat issued standing orders that if any man on the boat said the word "Squalus", he was to be marooned at the next port of call. This led to crew members referring to their boat as "Squailfish". That went over almost as well; a court martial was threatened for anyone heard using it.

=== World War II ===
==== First five patrols: December 1941 – August 1942 ====
Following the attack on Pearl Harbor, Sailfish departed Manila on her first war patrol, destined for the west coast of Luzon. Early on 10 December, she sighted a landing force, supported by cruisers and destroyers, but could not gain firing position. On the night of 13 December, she made contact with two Japanese destroyers and began a submerged attack; the destroyers detected her, dropping several depth charges, while Sailfish fired two torpedoes. Despite a large explosion nearby, no damage was done, and the destroyers counterattacked with 18–20 depth charges. She returned to Manila on 17 December.

Her second patrol (now under the command of Richard G. Voge), begun on 21 December, took the submarine to waters off Formosa. On the morning of 27 January 1942, off Halmahera, near Davao, she sighted a Myōkō-class cruiser, making a daylight submerged attack with four torpedoes, and reporting the target was damaged, for which she got credit. However, the damage could not be assessed since the cruiser's two escorts forced Sailfish to dive deep and run silent. Running at 260 ft (79 m), the submarine eluded the destroyers and proceeded south toward Java. She arrived at Tjilatjap on 14 February for refueling and rearming.

Departing on 19 February for her third patrol, she headed through Lombok Strait to the Java Sea. After sighting the heavy cruiser Houston and two escorts heading for Sunda Strait following the Allied defeat in the Battle of the Java Sea, Sailfish intercepted an enemy destroyer on 2 March. Following an unsuccessful attack, she was forced to dive deep to escape the ensuing depth-charge attack from the destroyer and patrol aircraft. That night, near the mouth of Lombok Strait, she spotted what appeared to be the 38,200-long-ton (38,800 t) aircraft carrier Kaga, escorted by four destroyers. Sailfish fired four torpedoes, scoring two hits. Leaving the target aflame and dead in the water, Sailfish dove, the escorts delivering 40 depth charges in the next 90 minutes. She eluded destroyers and aircraft and arrived at Fremantle, Western Australia, on 19 March, to great fanfare, believed to be the first U.S. submarine to have sunk an enemy carrier. In reality, the Kaga was scuttled in June, 1942, after damage sustained during the Battle of Midway, in that vicinity. Postwar, Kaga was revealed to have been nowhere in the area of Lombok Strait, and the target had in fact been the 6,440-long-ton (6,540 t) aircraft ferry Kamogawa Maru, still a valuable target.

The Java Sea and Celebes Sea were the areas of Sailfish's fourth patrol, from 22 March–21 May. After delivering 1,856 rounds of antiaircraft ammunition to "MacArthur's guerrillas", she made only one ship contact and was unable to attack the target before returning to Fremantle.

The submarine's fifth patrol—from 13 June through 1 August—was off the coast of Indochina in the South China Sea. On 4 July, she intercepted and tracked a large freighter, but discovered the intended target was a hospital ship and held her fire. On 9 July, she intercepted and torpedoed a Japanese freighter. One of a pair of torpedoes struck home and the ship took a 15° list. As Sailfish went deep, a series of explosions was heard, and no further screw noises were detected. When the submarine surfaced in the area 90 minutes later, no ship was in sight. She was credited during the war with a 7000-ton ship, and although postwar examination of Japanese records confirmed no sinking in the area on that date, the Sailfish had damaged the Japanese transport ship Aobasan Maru (8811 GRT) off the coast of Indochina in position 11°31'N, 109°21'E.

Sailfish observed only one other enemy vessel before the end of the patrol.

==== Sixth and seventh patrols: September 1942 – January 1943 ====
Shifting her base of operations to Brisbane, Sailfish (now under the command of John R. "Dinty" Moore) got underway for her sixth patrol on 13 September and headed for the western Solomon Islands. On the night of 17–18 September, she encountered eight Japanese destroyers escorting a cruiser, but she was unable to attack. On 19 September, she attacked a minelayer. The spread of three torpedoes missed, and Sailfish was forced to dive deep to escape the depth-charge counterattack. Eleven well-placed charges went off near the submarine, causing much minor damage. Sailfish returned to Brisbane on 1 November.

Underway for her seventh patrol on 24 November, Sailfish proceeded to the area south of New Britain. Following an unsuccessful attack on a destroyer on 2 December, the submarine made no other contacts until 25 December, when she believed she had scored a hit on a Japanese submarine. Postwar analysis of Japanese records could not confirm a sinking in the area. During the remainder of the patrol, she made unsuccessful attacks on a cargo ship and a destroyer before ending the patrol at Pearl Harbor on 15 January 1943.

==== Eighth and ninth patrols: May–September 1943 ====
After an overhaul at Mare Island Naval Shipyard from 27 January–22 April, Sailfish returned to Pearl Harbor on 30 April. Departing Hawaii on 17 May for her eighth patrol, she stopped off to fuel at Midway Island and proceeded to her station off the east coast of Honshū. Several contacts were made, but because of bad weather, were not attacked. On 15 June, she encountered two freighters off Todo Saki, escorted by three subchasers. Firing a spread of three stern torpedoes, she observed one hit. which stopped the maru dead in the water. Sailfish was driven down by the escort, but listened on her sound gear as Shinju Maru broke up and sank. Ten days later, she found a second convoy, three ships with a subchaser, and unusually, an aircraft, for escort. Sailfish once more fired three stern tubes, sinking Iburi Maru; in response, the subchaser, the aircraft, and three additional escorts pinned her down in a gruelling depth-charge attack lasting 10 hours and 98 charges, but causing only slight damage. After shaking loose pursuit, she set course for Midway on 26 June, arriving there on 3 July.

Her ninth patrol (commanded by William R. Lefavour) lasted from 25 July–16 September and covered the Formosa Strait and waters off Okinawa. It produced only two contacts (a 2500-ton steamer at Naha, Okinawa, and a junk), but no worthwhile targets, and Sailfish thereafter returned to Pearl Harbor.

==== Tenth patrol: November 1943 – January 1944 ====
After refit at Pearl Harbor, she departed (under the command of Robert E. McC. Ward) with a rejuvenated crew, on 17 November for her 10th patrol, which took her south of Honshū. Along the way, she suffered a "hot run" (the torpedo’s motor activates while still inside the launch tube) in tube eight (aft), and (after the skipper himself went over the side to inspect the damage) ejected the torpedo; the tube remained out of commission for the duration of the patrol.

After refueling at Midway, she was alerted by ULTRA of a fast convoy of Japanese ships before she arrived on station. Southeast of Yokosuka, on the night of 3 December, she made radar contact at 9,000 yd (8,200 m). The group consisted of the Japanese aircraft carrier Chūyō, a cruiser, and two destroyers. Despite high seas whipped up by typhoon winds, Sailfish maneuvered into firing position shortly after midnight on 3–4 December, dived to radar depth (just the radar aerial exposed), and fired four bow torpedoes at the carrier, at a range of 2,100 yd (1,900 m), scoring two hits. She went deep to escape the escorting destroyers, which dropped 21 depth charges (only two close), reloaded, and at 02:00, surfaced to resume the pursuit. She found a mass of radar contacts, and a slow-moving target, impossible to identify in the miserable visibility. As dawn neared, she fired another spread of three bow "fish" from 3,100 yd (2,800 m), scoring two more hits on the stricken carrier. Diving to elude the Japanese counterattack, which was hampered by the raging seas, Sailfish came to periscope depth, and at 07:58 saw the carrier lying dead in the water, listing to port and down by the stern. Preparations to abandon ship were in progress.

Later in the morning, Sailfish fired another spread of three torpedoes, from only 1,700 yd (1,600 m), scoring two final hits. Loud internal explosions and breaking-up noises were heard while the submarine dived to escape a depth-charge attack. Abruptly, a cruiser appeared, and fearing that she would broach the surface, Sailfish went to 90 ft (27 m), losing a chance at this new target. Shortly afterward, the carrier Chūyō (20,000 long tons (20,321 t)) went to the bottom, the first aircraft carrier sunk by an American submarine in the war, and the only major Japanese warship sunk by enemy action in 1943. In an ironic twist, Chūyō was carrying American prisoners of war from Sculpin, the same boat that had helped locate and rescue Sailfish—then Squalus—over four years before. Twenty of the 21 US crew members from Sculpin were killed. None, however, were of the original rescue crew; 1,250 Japanese were also killed.

After escaping a strafing attack by a Japanese fighter on 7 December, she made contact and commenced tracking two cargo ships with two escorts on the morning of 13 December, south of Kyūshū. That night, she fired a spread of four torpedoes at the two freighters. Two solid explosions were heard, including an internal secondary explosion. Sailfish heard Totai Maru (3,000 GRT) break up and sink as the destroyers made a vigorous but inaccurate depth-charge attack. When Sailfish caught up with the other freighter, she was dead in the water, but covered by a screen of five destroyers. Rather than face suicidal odds, the submarine quietly left the area. On the night of 20 December, she intercepted an enemy hospital ship, which she left unmolested.

On 21 December, in the approach to Bungo Suido (Bungo Channel), Sailfish intercepted six large freighters escorted by three destroyers. With five torpedoes left, she fired a spread of three stern tubes, scoring two hits on the largest target. Diving to escape the approaching destroyers, the submarine detected breaking-up noises as Uyo Maru (6400 GRT) went to the bottom; destroyers counterattacked with 31 depth charges, "some very close". Sailfish terminated her tenth patrol at Pearl Harbor on 5 January 1944. She claimed three ships for 35,729 GRT, plus damage to one for 7000 tons, believed to be the most successful patrol by tonnage to date; postwar, it was reduced to two ships and (less Uyo Maru) 29,571 tons.

==== Eleventh patrol: July–September 1944 ====
After an extensive overhaul at Mare Island—from 15–17 June—she returned to Hawaii and sailed on 9 July as part of a "wolfpack" ("Moseley's Maulers", commanded by Stan Moseley), with Greenling and Billfish, to prey on shipping in the Luzon–Formosa area. On the afternoon of 6 August, Sailfish and Greenling made contact with an enemy convoy. Sailfish maneuvered into firing position and fired a spread of three torpedoes at a mine layer. One hit caused the tanker to disintegrate into a column of water, smoke, and debris. It was not recorded in the postwar account. In fact, the Sailfish had sunk the Japanese Kinshu Maru (238 GRT) in Luzon Strait in position 20°09'N, 121°19'E.

Her next target was a battleship escorted by three destroyers, on which she made radar contact shortly after midnight on 18–19 August. At 01:35, after getting as close as she was able, 3,500 yd (3,200 m), Sailfish fired all four bow tubes. One of the escorts ran into the path of two fish; the other two missed. While the destroyer must have been severely damaged or sunk, there was nothing in JANAC.

On 24 August, south of Formosa, Sailfish made radar contact with an enemy convoy consisting of four cargo ships escorted by two small patrol craft. Moving into firing position, Sailfish fired a salvo of four torpedoes, scoring two hits. The cargo ship Toan Maru (2100 GRT) was enveloped in a cloud of smoke and shortly afterward broke in two and sank. Surfacing after escaping a depth-charge attack, Sailfish closed on a second cargo ship of the convoy, scoring two hits out of four torpedoes fired. The submarine's crew felt the cargo ship either had been sunk or badly damaged, but the sinking was not confirmed by JANAC postwar. Sailfish terminated her 11th patrol at Midway on 6 September; her wartime credit was four ships for 13,200 tons, a total reduced to just one of 2100 GRT (Toan Maru) postwar.

==== Twelfth patrol: September–December 1944 ====
Her 12th patrol—from 26 September through 11 December—was conducted between Luzon and Formosa, in company with Pomfret and Parche.

After passing through the edge of a typhoon, Sailfish arrived on station to perform lifeguard duty. On 12 October, staying surfaced in full view of enemy attackers, she rescued 12 Navy fliers who had ditched their stricken aircraft after strikes against Japanese bases on Formosa. She sank a sampan and a patrol craft with her deck gun as the enemy craft tried to capture the downed aviators. The following day, she rescued another flier. The submarines pulled into Saipan, arriving on 24 October, to drop off their temporary passengers, refuel, and make minor repairs.

After returning to the patrol area with the wolf pack, she made an unsuccessful attack on a transport on 3 November. The following day, Sailfish damaged the Japanese destroyer Harukaze and Japanese landing ship T-111 (890 tons) in Luzon Strait in position 20°08'N, 121°43'E, but was slightly damaged herself by a bomb from a patrol aircraft. With battle damage under control, Sailfish eluded her pursuers and cleared the area. After riding out a typhoon on 9–10 November, she intercepted a convoy on the evening of 24 November heading for Itbayat in the Philippines. After alerting Pomfret of the convoy's location and course, Sailfish was moving into an attack position, when one of the escorting destroyers headed straight for her. Sailfish fired a three-torpedo spread "down the throat" and headed toward the main convoy. At least one hit was scored on the destroyer and her pip faded from the radar screen. Suddenly, Sailfish received an unwelcome surprise when she came under fire from the destroyer that she had believed to be sunk. Sailfish ran deep after ascertaining no hull damage had resulted from a near miss from the escort's guns. For the next 4 1/2 hours, Sailfish was forced to run silent and deep as the Japanese kept up an uncomfortably accurate depth-charge attack. Finally, the submarine eluded the destroyers and slipped away. Shortly thereafter, Sailfish headed for Hawaii, via Midway, and completed her 12th and final war patrol upon arriving at Pearl Harbor on 11 December. Sailfish had damaged the IJN destroyer Harukaze, which had previously sunk USS Shark, and also a landing ship.

==== Return stateside ====
Following refit, Sailfish departed Hawaii on 26 December and arrived at New London, via the Panama Canal, on 22 January 1945. For the next four and one-half months, she aided training out of New London. Next, she operated as a training ship at Guantanamo Bay from 9 June–9 August. After a six-week stay at Philadelphia Navy Yard, she arrived at Portsmouth, New Hampshire, on 2 October for deactivation.

=== Post war ===
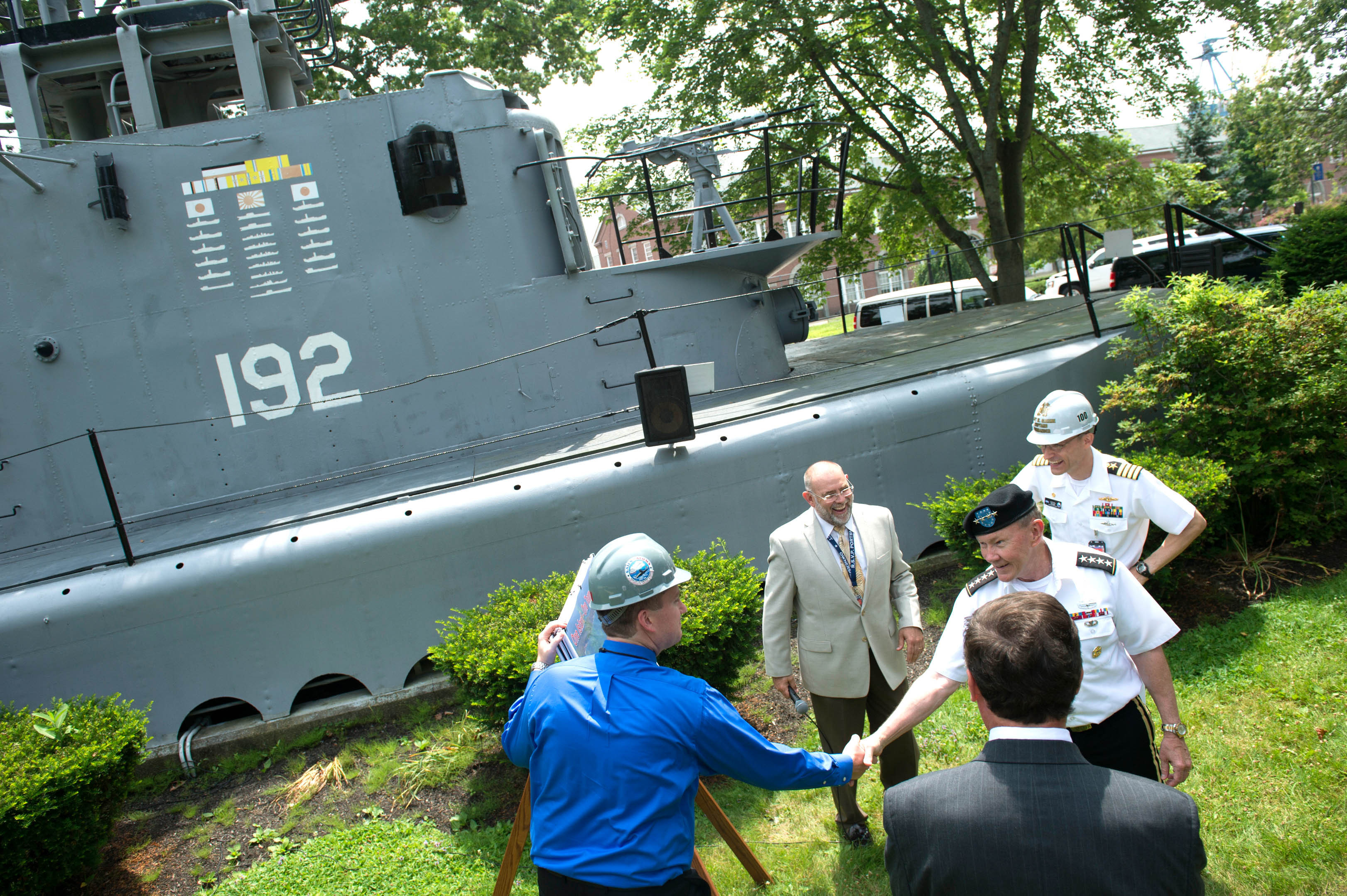
Conning tower of SS-192 on display at Portsmouth Naval Shipyard, seen during a 2013 visit by General Martin Dempsey, then Chairman of the Joint Chiefs of Staff

After being decommissioned on 27 October 1945, efforts by the city of Portsmouth and area residents to have the submarine kept intact as a memorial were not successful. Agreement was reached to have her conning tower saved, which was dedicated in November 1946 on Armistice Day, by John L. Sullivan, then Undersecretary of the Navy. The remainder of the submarine was initially scheduled to be a target in the atomic bomb tests or sunk by conventional ordnance. However, she was placed on sale in March 1948 and stricken from the Naval Vessel Register on 30 April 1948. The hulk was sold for scrapping to Luria Brothers of Philadelphia, Pennsylvania, on 18 June 1948. Her conning tower still stands at the Portsmouth Naval Shipyard in Kittery as a memorial to her lost crewmen (43°04′55.4″N 70°44′18.7″W).

== Honors and awards ==
- Presidential Unit Citation for outstanding performance on her 10th war patrol
- American Defense Service Medal
- American Campaign Medal
- Asiatic-Pacific Campaign Medal with nine battle stars for World War II service
- World War II Victory Medal

== In media ==
The 2001 television movie docudrama Submerged, directed by James Keach and starring Sam Neill as Charles B. "Swede" Momsen and James B. Sikking as Admiral Cyrus Cole, depicted the events surrounding the loss of USS Squalus and the rescue of her 33 survivors. The plot was written to closely follow the events of the sinking.

Submerged used models and sets originally constructed for the 2000 film U-571. The floating set used in Submerged to represent both Squalus and Sculpin is the non-diving replica built in Malta as the "modified" USS S-33 (SS-138) for U-571, which also was shot in Malta. The replica is still afloat, moored in Marsa in the inner part of the Grand Harbour (35°52′46.00″N 14°29′49.92″E) at Malta.

In 2006, BBC TV presented a series of programs entitled Voyages of Discovery, the first of which, called "Hanging by a Thread", told the story of the USS Squalus rescue mission, as narrated by Paul Rose.

== See also ==
- List of disasters in New Hampshire by death toll

== Bibliography ==
- Barrows, Nathaniel A. Blow All Ballast! The Story of the Squalus. New York: Dodd, Mead & Co, 1940.
- Blair, Clay Jr. (1975). Silent Victory. Philadelphia: Lippincott. ISBN 978-0-397-01089-9. OCLC 821363.
- Friedman, N. (1995). U.S. Submarines Through 1945. Naval Institute Press. ISBN 1-55750-263-3.
- Gray, Edwyn. Disasters of the Deep: A Comprehensive Survey of Submarine Accidents and Disasters. Annapolis, Md: Naval Institute Press, 2003.
- Holwitt, Joel Ira (2009). "Execute Against Japan" The U.S. Decision to Conduct Unrestricted Subnarine Warfare. Texas A&M University Press. ISBN 9781603440837.
- Keach, James (2000). Submerged (Film). New York: NBC. (Television movie. The film does not acknowledge any design flaw and claims the cause is unknown.)
- LaVO, Carl. Back from the Deep: The Strange Story of the Sister Subs Squalus and Sculpin. Annapolis, Md: Naval Institute Press, 1994.
- Maas, Peter. The Rescuer. New York: Harper & Row, 1967.
- Maas, Peter (1999). The Terrible Hours: The Man Behind the Greatest Submarine Rescue in History. New York: HarperCollins Publishers. ISBN 978-0-06-019480-2. OCLC 41504915.
- USS Squalus, Ship Source Files, Ships History Branch, Naval Historical Center
- "Oliver Francis Naquin," Obituary, The New York Times, 15 November. 1989
- Department's Report on "Squalus" Disaster. Washington: U.S. G.P.O., 1939.
- Naval Historical Center (U.S.). USS Squalus (SS-192) The Sinking, Rescue of Survivors, and Subsequent Salvage, 1939. Washington, D.C.: Naval Historical Center, 1998. http://www.history.navy.mil/faqs/faq99-1.htm
- Mariners' Museum (Newport News, Va.). Salvage of the Squalus: Clippings from Newspapers, 25 May 20 January 1939, 1941. Newport News, Va: Mariners' Museum, 1942.
- Portsmouth Naval Shipyard (U.S.). Technical Report of the Salvage of U.S.S. Squalus. Portsmouth, N.H.: U.S. Navy Yard, 1939.
- Falcon (Salvage ship), and Albert R. Behnke. Log of Diving During Rescue and Salvage Operations of the USS Squalus: Diving Log of USS Falcon, 24 May 1939 – 12 September 1939. Kensington, Maryland: Reprinted by Undersea & Hyperbaric Medical Society, 2001
- "Diving in the U.S. Navy a brief history". purl.access.gpo.gov. Archived from the original on 18 October 2004.
