= McCann Rescue Chamber =

Diving bell for rescuing submariners

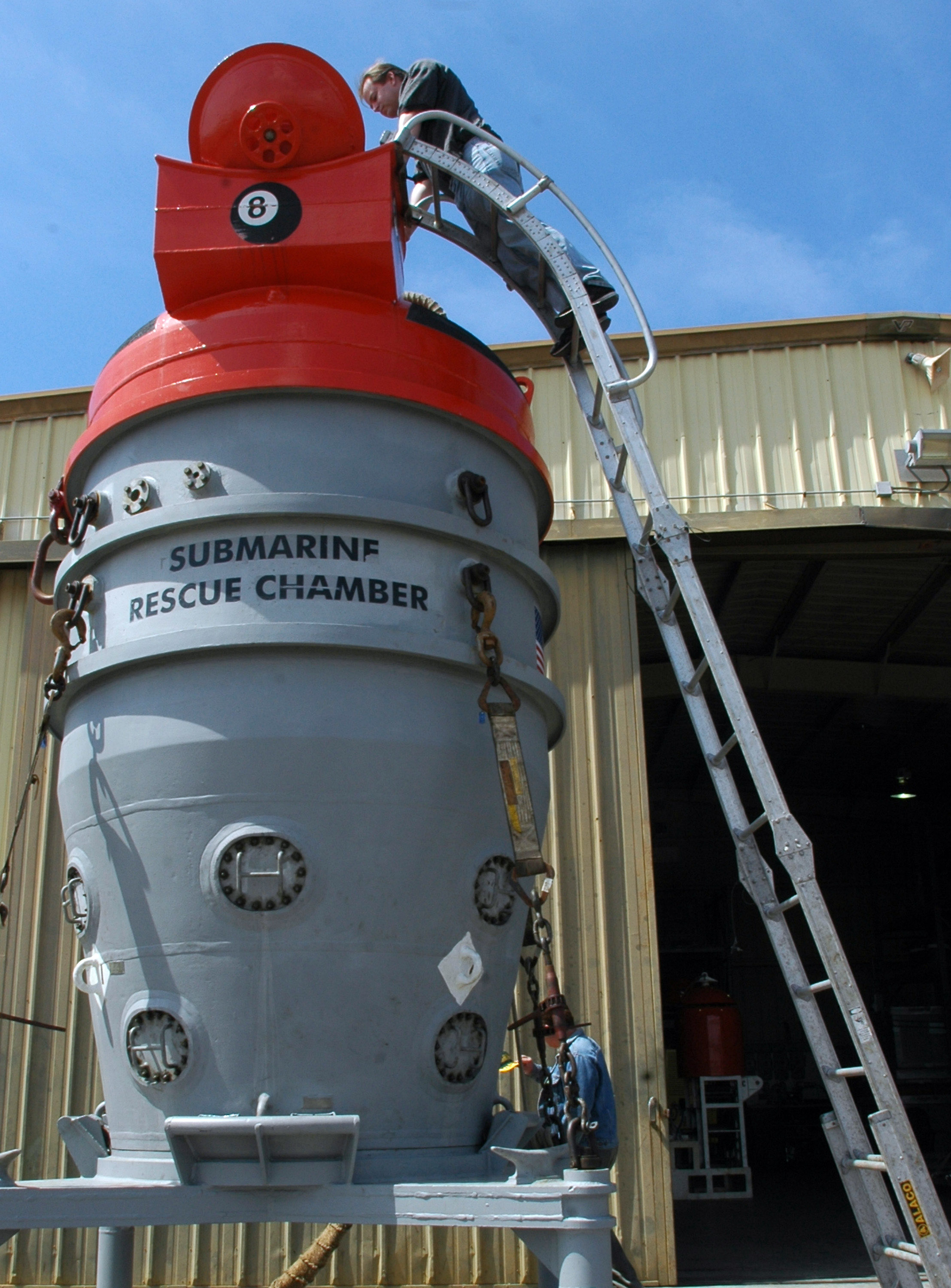
A US Navy Submarine Rescue Chamber, an improved version of the McCann Submarine Rescue Chamber, at Naval Air Station North Island, San Diego, 2007

The McCann Submarine Rescue Chamber is a device for rescuing submariners from a submarine that is unable to surface.

== History ==
During the first two decades of the United States Navy Submarine Force, there were several accidents in which Navy submarines sank with the loss of life. The impetus for the invention for the chamber was the loss of S-51 on 25 September 1925 and the loss of S-4 on 17 December 1927. In the case of S-4, all of her officers and men were able to reach non-flooded compartments as the submarine bottomed in 110 ft (34 m) of water. However, the majority soon succumbed. In her forward torpedo room, six men remained alive. Heroic efforts were made to rescue these six, who had exchanged a series of signals with divers by tapping on the hull. In extremely cold water and tangled wreckage, Navy divers worked to rescue them, but a storm forced a stop to this effort on 24 December. Forty men lost their lives.

These experiences led submariner Charles B. "Swede" Momsen to think of technical alternatives for rescuing survivors from sunken submarines, which at that time was still a virtual impossibility. Momsen soon conceived a submarine rescue chamber that could be lowered from the surface to mate with a submarine's escape hatch and proposed the concept through official channels. While in command of the submarine S-1 (SS-105), in 1926, Momsen wrote the Bureau of Construction and Repair (BuC&R) recommending the adoption of a diving bell for the purposes of rescuing entrapped personnel from submarines. But this idea was pigeonholed by the bureaucracy, even during his own subsequent assignment at BuC&R. The loss of S-4 with all hands put the Navy very much "on the spot" because of the loss of lives that might have been saved. The pressure of this incident forced favorable action and Momsen, using the aircraft hangar from S-1, designed and built a prototype submarine rescue chamber.

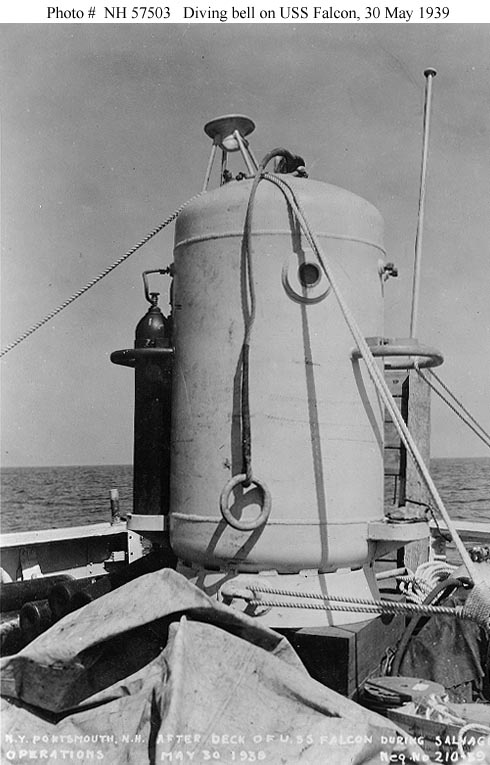
Momsen-McCann Rescue Bell Prototype

During the first three months of 1928, divers and other salvage personnel were able to raise S-4 and tow her to the Boston Navy Yard, where she was drydocked and repaired. She returned to active duty in October 1928 and was employed thereafter as a submarine rescue and salvage test ship. Momsen went to sea in the reconditioned S-4 to carry out practical experiments and training with the rescue chambers.

Work with S-4 helped to develop equipment and techniques that bore fruit a decade later, when 33 men were brought up alive from the sunken submarine Squalus. The first diving bells for rescuing men from submarines were designed by the BuC&R in 1928. The diving bell went through a series of tests off the shores of Key West, Florida. Based on these tests, Momsen had several changes in mind for the bell, and after nearly two years of experimentation full of highly interesting results, the final bell was evolved and christened a "rescue chamber." This success was catalyst for gaining approval for development of the submarine rescue chamber in 1930. Before he could make these changes, Momsen went to the Bureau of Construction and Repair to work on an underwater breathing apparatus (the "Momsen Lung") for individual escapes.

Lieutenant Commander Allan Rockwell McCann was put in charge of the revisions on the diving bell. From July 1929 to July 1931, McCann was assigned to the Maintenance Division, Bureau of Construction and Repair, where he developed the submarine rescue chamber. When the bell was completed in late 1930, it was produced as the McCann Submarine Rescue Chamber (SRC) (Navy designated the first 12 of these as [YRC] 1–12, YRC-4 was lost aboard the USS Pigeon, at Bataan, Philippines, during the first days of WWII. YRC-5 was aboard the USS Widgeon during the attack on Pearl Harbor). In 1931, a one-fifth scale model of a diving bell for submarine rescue work was built and tested. Design called for the bell to withstand the external pressure encountered at a depth of at least 300 ft (91 m) of water, and the test showed the model fulfilled this requirement with a factor of safety of about 3.5. The vessel was tested under external pressure, failure occurring in the shell at a pressure of 470 psi (3,200 kPa). Since the head of the vessel remained intact, it was decided to make a test of the head itself in order to determine its strength relative to that of the shell, and if possible to obtain some measure of the stresses occurring under load. The head collapsed at a pressure of 525 psi (3,620 kPa), indicating its strength under external pressure was about 10% in excess of that of the shell.

The revised Submarine Rescue Chamber had improvements including a soft seal gasket for sealing the submarine/bell interface skirting, and a floor installed to maintain air-space in the bell during raising and lowering. Momsen in his speech to the Harvard Engineering Society on 6 October 1939 credited Allan Rockwell McCann with the improvements which made the bell operational, safe and large enough to hold up to eight rescued crewmen and two operators.

== The Squalus rescue ==
In 1939, the McCann Rescue Chamber made its debut when it was used to successfully rescue thirty-three survivors from Squalus, At the time of Squalus' accident, Lieutenant Commander Momsen was serving as head of the Experimental Diving Unit at the Washington Navy Yard. The submarine rescue ship USS Falcon (ASR-2), commanded by Lieutenant George A. Sharp, was on site within twenty-four hours. It lowered the Rescue Chamber — a revised version of a diving bell invented by Momsen — and, in four dives over the next 13 hours, recovered all 33 survivors in the first deep submarine rescue ever. McCann was in charge of Chamber operations, with Momsen commanding the divers. Although there was no reason to believe anyone was alive in the aft part of the ship, a fifth dive was made to the aft torpedo room hatch on May 25. This run confirmed the flooding of the entire aft portion of the ship.

== Design ==
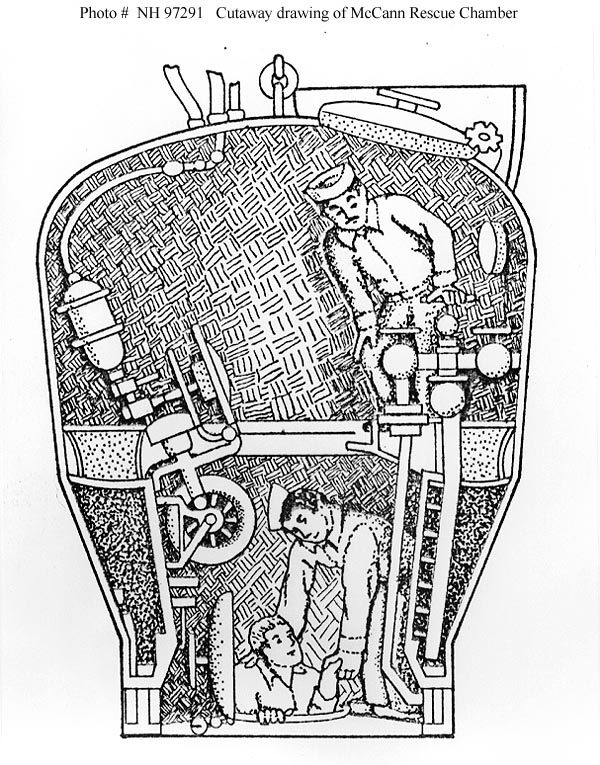
Cutaway drawing of the McCann Rescue Chamber.

The rescue chamber was a pear shaped steel chamber, the big end uppermost, seven feet at the greatest diameter and ten feet high. It is divided into an upper closed compartment and a lower open compartment by a horizontal bulkhead which has a water tight hatch in its middle. Surrounding the lower compartment is a ballast tank of a capacity just equal to that of the lower compartment. Inside the lower compartment is a reel with 400 ft (120 m) of .5 in (13 mm) steel wire on it. The reel is operated by a shaft leading into the upper compartment. The shaft is rotated by an air motor. On the bottom edge of the lower compartment a rubber gasket is embedded into a circular groove, so that when the chamber is brought into contact with a flat surface (the hatch ring) a water tight joint may be effected with the application of pressure. Attached to the upper compartment is an air supply and an atmospheric exhaust hose, wire wound for strength. Also electric cables for telephone and light are attached. A wire pendant for hoisting and lowering is shackled into a pad-eye on top. This wire is also used for retrieving the chamber in case of emergency. The forward and aft hatches of American submarines were fitted for attaching the rescue chamber. They have a flat annular plate welded to the hatch coaming upon which the bottom of the chamber rests to make the seal, and a bail over the center of the hatch to which the haul down wire must be attached by the diver.

== Limitations ==
The McCann bell suffers severe limitations in strong currents and when dealing with a pressurized submarine or one lying at extreme angles. It is also incapable of functioning below 850 ft (260 m). The USN Submarine Rescue Chamber (YRC) is air transportable to a Vessel Of Opportunity (VOO) Mother Ship (MOSHIP) which requires little modification to use the system. Transfer Under Pressure (TUP) to and from pressurized environments such as submarines or hyperbaric chambers is not possible with this system, even though TUP is essential when being subjected to ambient pressure may be life-threatening. Since the creation of the Deep Submergence Rescue Vehicles Mystic and Avalon, the McCann Rescue Chamber is rarely used, but is part of the Submarine Rescue Chamber Flyaway System (SRCFS) which is capable of worldwide submarine rescue missions. Once launched, the SRCFS is able to operate around the clock.

== See also ==
- Escape trunk – Ambient pressure escape system for submarines
- Deep-submergence rescue vehicle – Submersible used for rescue of people from disabled submarines and submersibles
- Mystic-class deep-submergence rescue vehicle – Class of US Navy submersible for rescue operations on submerged, disabled submarines
- Submarine Rescue Diving Recompression System – Remotely operated vehicle for rescue of personnel from sunken submarines
- Submarine rescue ship – Support ship for submarine rescue and deep-sea salvage operations
