= Navy diver (United States Navy) =

US Navy personnel qualified in underwater diving and salvage

Navy Diver
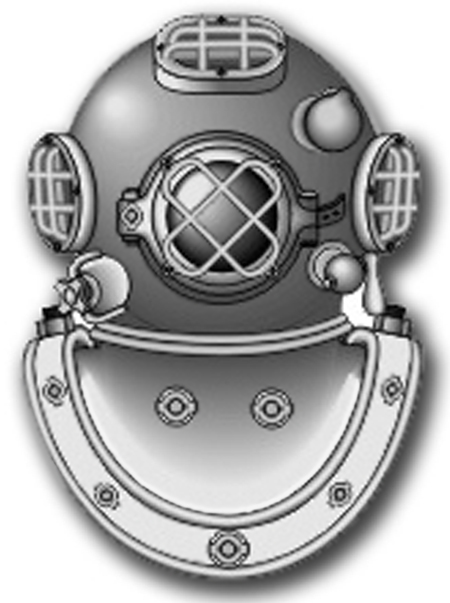
- U.S. Navy enlisted rating insignia
- Issued by: United States Navy
- Type: Enlisted rating
- Abbreviation: ND
- Specialty: Diving; Harbor clearance Experimental diving Ship husbandry Submarine rescue Special Operations support Underwater Construction Teams

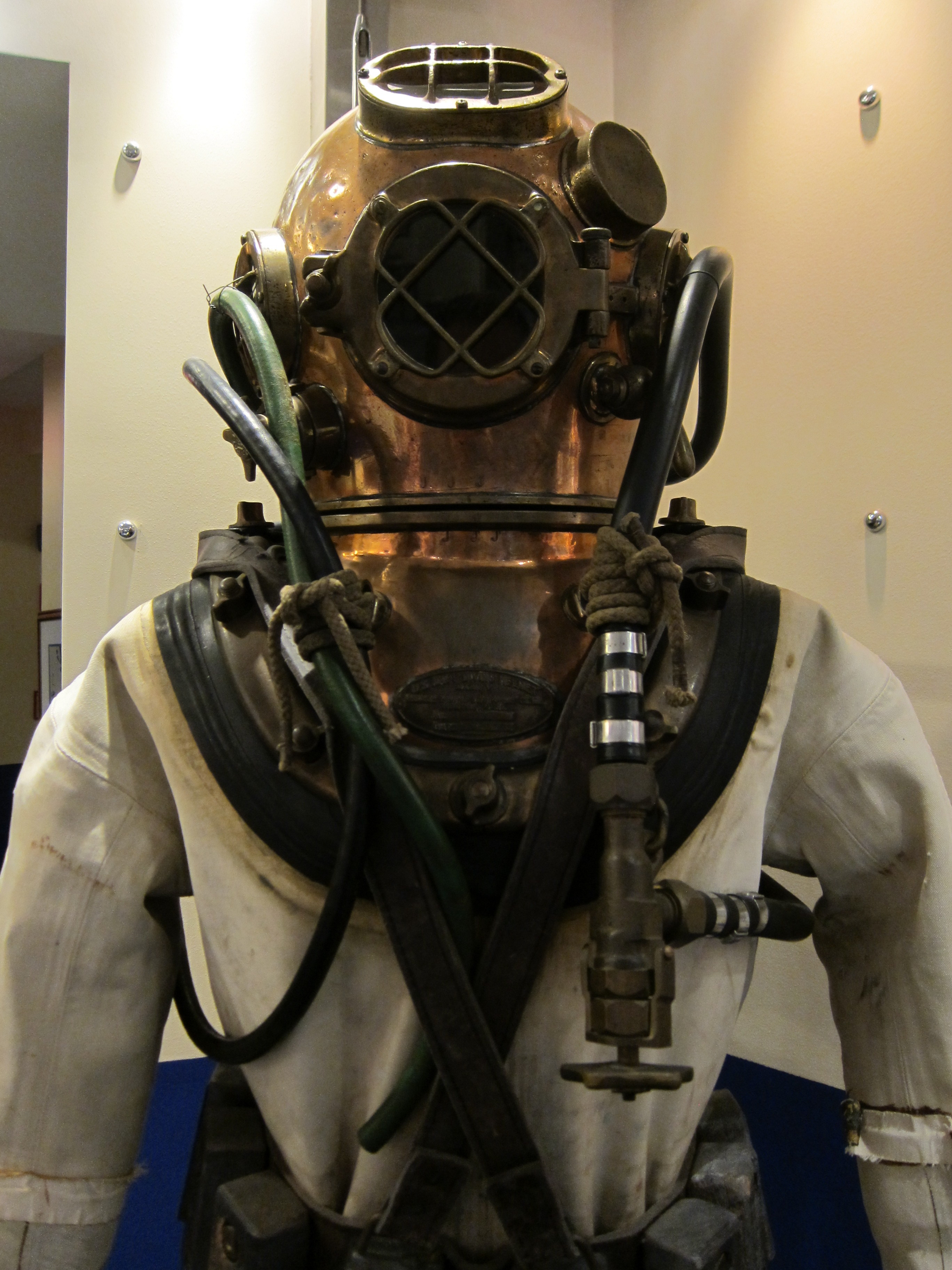
Mark V dive suit in the Naval History and Heritage Command at the Washington Navy Yard, Washington D.C.

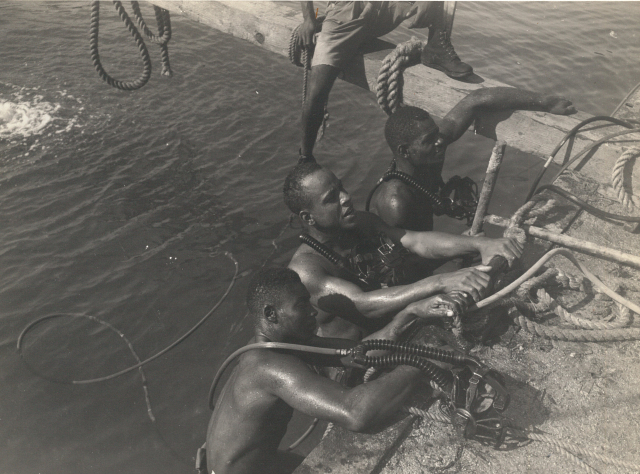
Seabee divers at Gavutu, Solomon Islands, Nov. 8, 1943 installing a marine railway.

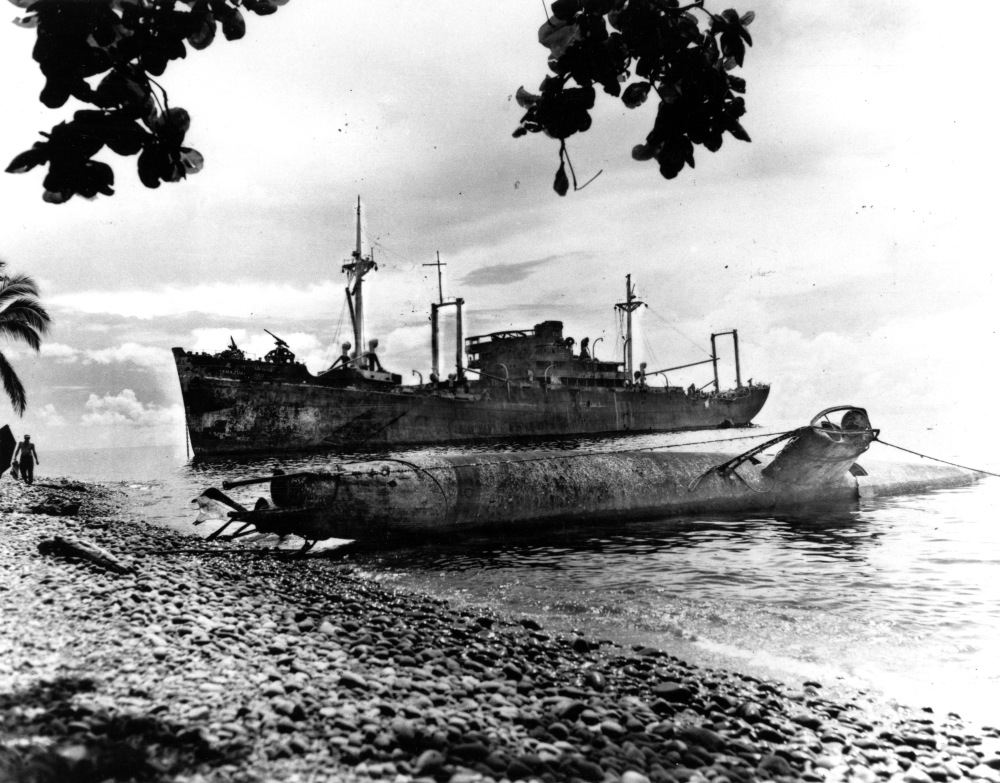
A Japanese two-man sub salvaged by 6th CB divers off Tassafaronga Point. They attached hawsers for bulldozers to pull the sub ashore after placing dynamite to break the mud suction force holding it.

A United States Navy diver may be a restricted fleet line (Engineering Duty) officer, Civil Engineer Corps (CEC) officer, Medical Corps officer, an Unrestricted Line Officer who is qualified in Explosive Ordnance Disposal (EOD) Warfare (1140) or an enlisted (ND or HM rating) who is qualified in underwater diving and salvage. Navy divers serve with fleet diving detachments and in research and development. Some of the mission areas of the Navy diver include: marine salvage, harbor clearance, underwater ship husbandry and repair, submarine rescue, saturation diving, experimental diving, underwater construction and welding, as well as serving as technical experts to the Navy SEALs, Marine Corps, and Navy EOD diving commands.

The U.S. Navy is the lead agency in military diving technology and training within the U.S. Department of Defense. The foundation of the Navy diving program consists of the Navy Diver (ND) rating for enlisted personnel who perform diving as their occupational specialty in the Navy.

== History through World War II ==
The US Navy began employing divers in the middle of the 19th century; these were primarily swimmers and skin divers using techniques that had not been altered for hundreds of years. Duties included the salvage and repair of ships, construction work and military operations, and the Battle of Mobile Bay during the American Civil War. Preparations for the battle included the sending of swimmers to clear mines from the path of Admiral Farragut's ships, that had been planted by Confederate States forces to prevent entrance to the bay.

In 1898, Navy divers were briefly involved in an international crisis when the second-class armored battleship USS Maine was sunk by a mysterious explosion while anchored in the harbor at Havana, Cuba. Navy divers were sent from Key West to study and report on the wreck. Although a Court of Inquiry was convened, the reason for the sinking was not found.

As American technology expanded in the early 1900s the US Navy developed an interest in submarine warfare. However, throughout the period of 1912–1939, the development of the Navy's F-class, H-class and S-class submarines was marred by a series of accidents, collisions, and sinkings. As a result of these submarine disasters a corresponding growth in the Navy's diving capability was developed.

Until 1912, US Navy divers rarely went below 60 FSW (feet of seawater). There is little documentation that the Navy had a diving program prior to 1912. In that year, Chief Gunner George D. Stillson set up a program to test Haldane's diving tables and methods of stage decompression. A companion goal of the program was to develop improvements in Navy diving equipment. Throughout a three-year period, first diving in tanks ashore and then in open water in Long Island Sound from USS Walke, Navy divers went progressively deeper.

The publication of the first US Navy Diving Manual in 1916 and the establishment of a Navy Diving School at Newport, Rhode Island were the direct outgrowth of experience gained in the test program and the USS F-4 salvage. When the United States entered World War I, the staff and graduates of the school were sent to Europe, where they conducted a number of salvage operations along the French coast.

On 24 May 1939 four divers would earn the Medal of Honor rescuing 33 men off the sunken USS Squalus. When the Squalus went down twelve divers from the Experimental Diving Unit were part of the rescue. Those directly involved in the most dangerous aspects of the rescue received the medals.

WWII brought with it an expanded need for divers that began immediately after the December 7, 1941 Japanese attack on Pearl Harbor. By afternoon on the 7th nine divers from Destroyer Repair Unit 1 at San Diego were on a PBY being flown to Hawaii. Their first priority was to save lives, despite considerable effort they only found dead. They were attached to the Naval Salvage and Repair Unit created at Pearl Harbor where divers logged over 16,000 hours under diving officer Commander Haynes. Because of the shallow working depth the divers had no diving time limitation leading to fourteen hour days seven days a week. The Salvage Unit list of work included USS California, USS Nevada, USS Utah, USS Arizona, USS West Virginia, USS Oklahoma and USS Oglala. They were assisted by the divers off USS Widgeon and USS Ortolan. Soon after the 16th Naval Construction Battalion arrived in Pearl Harbor her divers were tasked to the recovery of USS Oklahoma as well. Two steelworkers from CB 3 had previously been certified to dive with the Salvage and Repair Unit on USS West Virginia, however they were recalled because their commanding officer objected to the pay they received. This led to no more volunteers from outside the Salvage Unit being trained to dive with the Salvage Unit. At Pearl Harbor the diving assignments were split civilian/military with the civilians outside the vessels and USN inside. The divers from Destroyer Repair Unit 1 are credited with creating the arc-oxygen underwater cutting torch. A diving task at Pearl Harbor was the recovery of bodies. It was a gruesome task that was eventually stopped as bodies would simply come apart when disturbed, from being submerged too long.

The creation of Naval Construction Battalions to build advance bases in the Pacific Theater put more diving assignments in front of the Navy, enough that the Seabees had a school of their own to qualify 2nd class divers. CBs would put men in the water from the tropics to the Arctic Circle. In the Aleutian Islands Naval Construction Battalion 4 had divers doing salvage on the Russian freighter SS Turksib in 42 °F (6 °C) water. In the tropics Seabee divers would be sent close to an enemy airfield to retrieve a downed Japanese aircraft. At Halavo on Florida Island, divers from the 27th CB recovered a Disburser's safe full of money plus changed 160 props on vessels of all sizes. The 27th Naval Construction Battalion logged 2,550 diving hours, with 1,345 classified as "extra hazardous". Seabees would also blur the definition of diver with the development of the Underwater Demolition Teams. Another historic note to the Seabees is that they had African American divers in the 34th CB. Those men fabricated their diving gear in the field as instructed at diving school. For depths less than 60 ft (18 m) a modified USN Mk III or MK IV gas mask was considered acceptable and preferred by the men of the 27th CB. Twice, while at Milne Bay, the 105th CB sent special diving details on undisclosed missions. Divers in the 301st CB placed as much as 50 tons of explosives a day to keep their dredges productive. However, the divers of CB 96 used 1,727,250 lbs of dynamite to blast 423,300 cubic yards (323,600 m^{3}) of coral for the ship repair facility on Manicani Island, as an element of the Naval Operating Base Leyte-Samar. Their primary diving gear was modified Navy Mk III and Navy Mk IV gas masks.

The war itself produced an unending demand for underwater ship repair and salvage. In New York, USS Lafayette capsized at the dock leading to the Navy creating a Salvage school right there to deal with the issue. For the next year the Navy had 75 divers working on her salvage. Each of the fleet's repair ships had divers. Six of them from USS Vestal were put to the test using the new technology of underwater cutting and welding. The stern was nearly completely blown off USS Pensacola. They removed three propellers and stabilized ship structure enough so that she could be towed to a drydock. Divers from USS Navajo were there too with their underwater cutters working on USS New Orleans. Their salvage work in combat zones got a fleet tug a Battle Star. Two divers plus their support teams were put aboard USS Seminole in response to a secret dispatch from Commander South Service Force Pacific. Each of the submarine rescue ships had divers assigned too. USS Florikan was sent to Kiska Harbor after divers off USS Ute confirmed the Japanese submarine I-7 was lying on the bottom in ten fathoms (18 m) of water. Seven divers off the Florikan salvaged intelligence materials from the sub. Earlier in the year, at Kamimbo Bay, USS Ortolan divers recovered a pile of documents off the partially sunk Japanese submarine I-1 that was turned over to intelligence. The clearance of Manila harbor was a huge project where divers led by master diver Joseph S. Karneke from USS Chanticleer repeated the action. There they salvaged code books, maps of Japanese fortifications on Luzon plus 500,000 yen; it was a major intelligence coup. When Chanticleer first left the States part of its mission was to provide diver training to the fleet based out of Freemantle, Australia. The US Navy out of Australia sent divers down to recover intelligence off the Japanese submarine I-124 in just four fathoms (7.3 m) of water.

When the Japanese took the Philippines a couple of the prisoners were USN divers, one was Robert Sheats. The Japanese quickly learned of what the Philippine Treasury had done with the silver that had been in the vault on Corregidor. Millions of dollars in silver coinage had been dumped in Caballo Bay, an inlet on greater Manila Bay, to keep it from falling into Japanese hands. The Japanese forced USN pow divers to retrieve the coinage. They did recover some of the treasure. However, the U.S. Army and Navy put together a hard hat diving unit in August 1945 that recovered millions of Pesos off USS Teak.

During WWII, "diver" was a qualification not a rate. First class divers could work 300 ft (91 m) depths while salvage and second class divers were qualified down to 150 ft (46 m). Diving was considered "hazardous" by the Navy and the Navy adjusted pay for both the qualification as well as time and depth under water: $5 an hour or fraction of an hour for hazardous salvage work. Adjusted for inflation that converts to $72/hr in 2020. The qualification diver 2nd class paid $10 per month, salvage diver paid $12 per month, 1st class paid $15 per month. First class divers also drew "footage" of $15 plus $.05/ft at 120 ft (37 m). Master divers drew $20 plus up to $10 "footage". A few months after Pearl Harbor Congress authorized a change so that divers were paid $5.00/hr for any dive certified "extremely hazardous". All dives to salvage ships at Pearl Harbor were given that designation.

== Post World War II ==
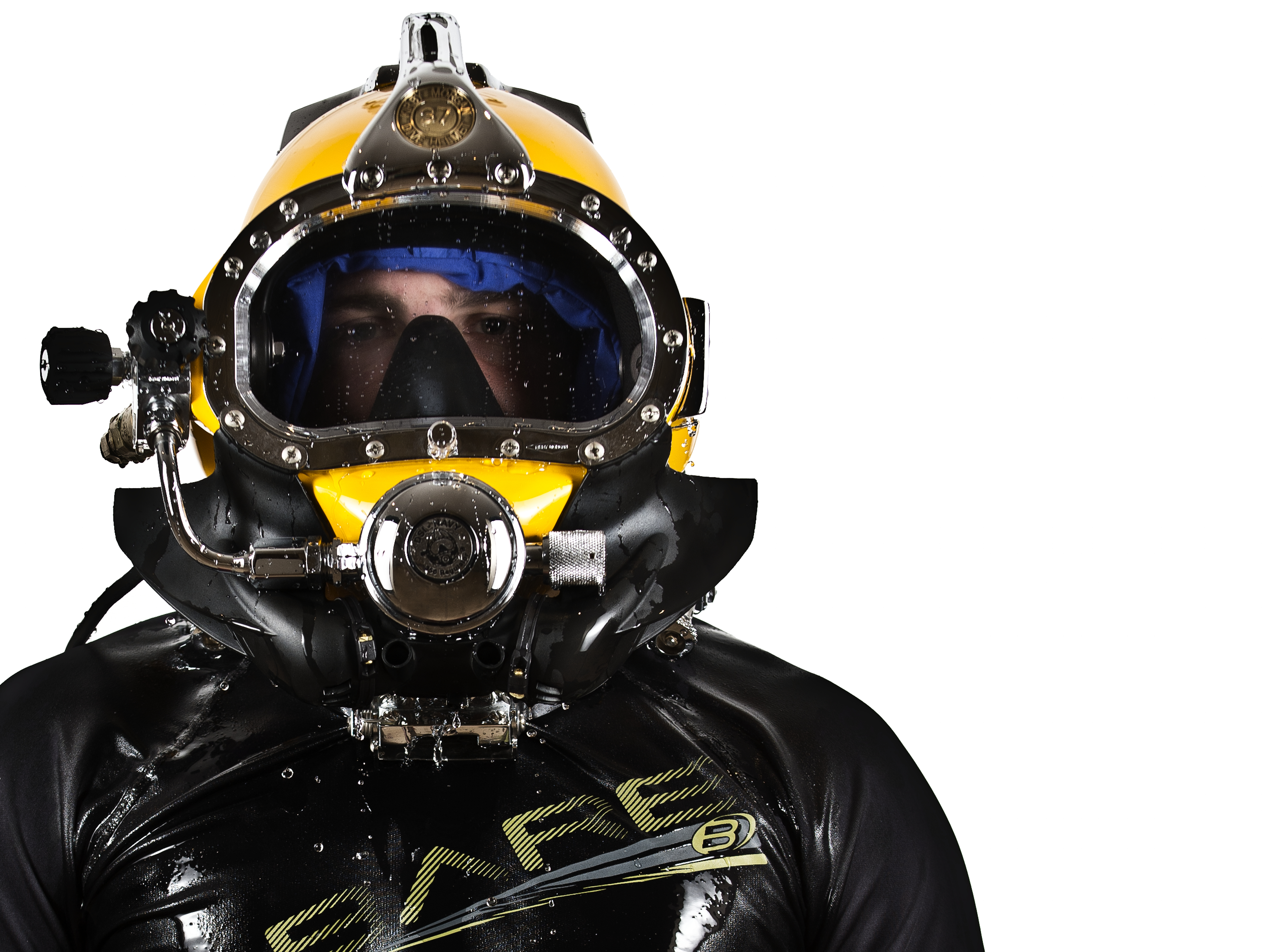
130413-N-GG400-043 Diver 3rd Class Jacob Laman of MDSU 2, wearing the Kirby Morgan 37 dive helmet used today for deep diving

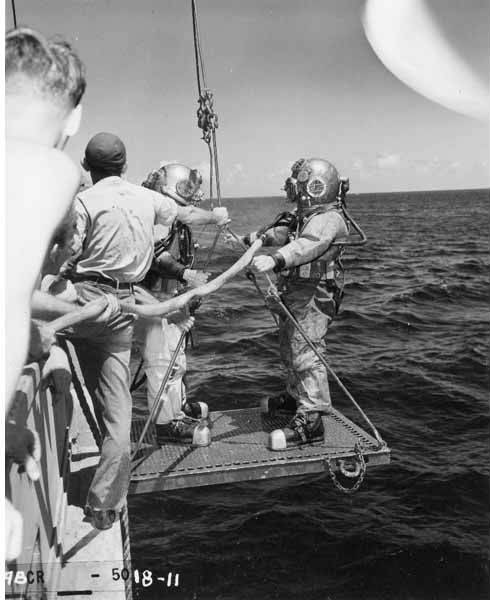
Divers off USS Preserver preparing to do a visual survey of USS Saratoga at Bikini atoll in 1947

At Operation Crossroads the Navy had qualified divers on multiple ships assigned to Task Unit TU 1.2.7 (salvage unit) of the Joint Task Force 1: USS Clamp, USS Conserver, USS Coucal, USS Current, USS Etlah, USS Gypsy, USS Preserver, and USS Widgeon. After the nuclear tests diving officers were tasked to take their teams to inspect wrecks, document the damage, recover scientific data from test stations, recover scientific instruments and do salvage as required. The Diving officers did written reports of all observations, C.2.9 identifies what was found on USS Arkansas on 21 August 1947 with everything underwater photographed. USS Skipjack was the only ship to be raised and recovered from the operation. The divers off the Widgeon and the Gypsy brought her up. Salvage of USS Pilotfish was attempted, but the sub was damaged beyond saving and stricken from the roles. Salvage of USS Apogon was started, but she was declared a loss. Divers carried a watertight Geiger tube that was monitored by their support crews so that they could be warned and retracted from radioactive hot spots.

The Korean War brought development to USN diving. In October 1950 USS Pledge struck a mine in Wosan harbor and sank. A UDT diver using an Aqualung located and marked the ships location for surface supported hard hat divers to return and destroy the classified materials on board. That was the first tactical use of scuba gear by the U.S. Navy. For the UDTs it marked a transitional change in their mission model and for the Navy it changed thinking of diving as a solely non-combat task.

The United States Navy Experimental Diving Unit is located at Panama City, Florida. There unit is composed of 120 service personnel drawn from numerous components of the Navy. It is their job to execute the U.S. military's special diving tasks like saturation diving.

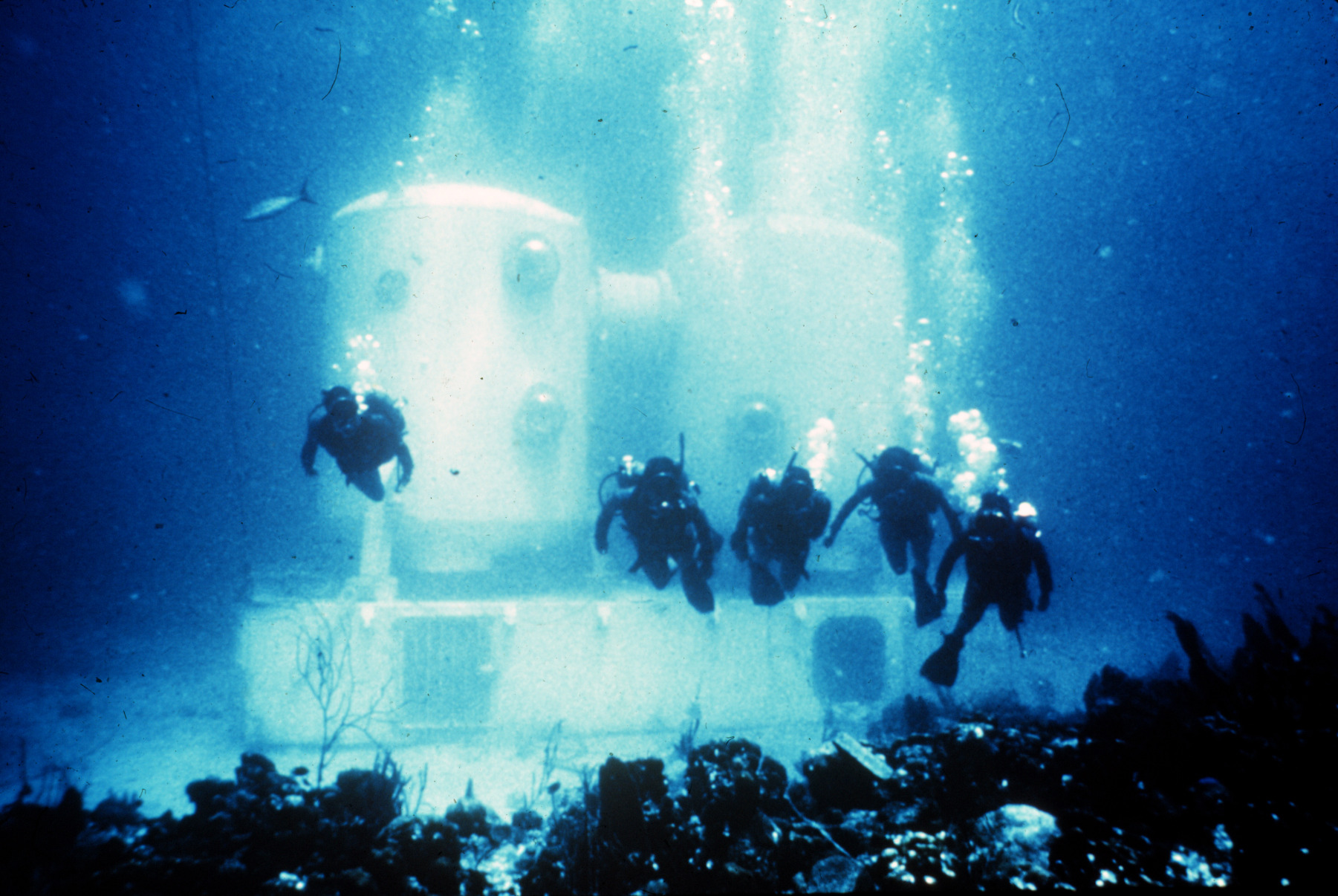
Tektite I assembled by Amphibious Construction Battalion 2 (ACB 2)

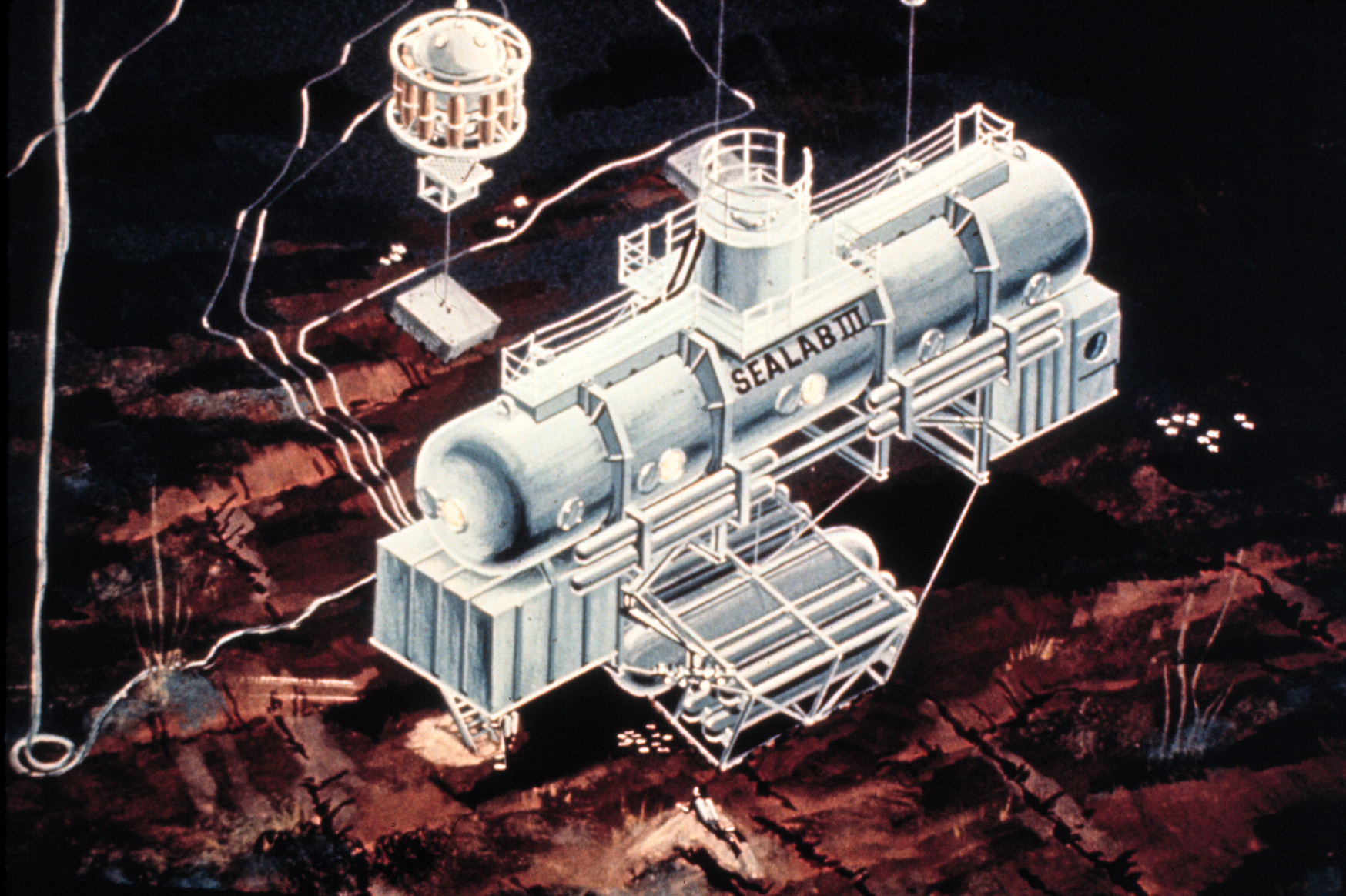
SEALAB III, artist's drawing

During the 1960s the Navy had divers involved in two submersed projects, Tektite and SEALAB I, II, and III. On 28 January 1969 a detachment of 50 men from Amphibious Construction Battalion 2 plus 17 Seabee divers began installation of the Tektite habitat in Great Lameshur Bay at Lameshur, U.S. Virgin Islands. The Tektite program was funded by NASA and was the first scientists-in-the-sea program sponsored by the US government. The Tektite project was a product of the Cold War. It caused the US Navy to realize the need for a permanent Underwater Construction capability that led to the formation the Seabee Underwater Construction Teams.

SEALAB was led by Captain George F. Bond with divers from the fleet. SEALAB I, II, and III were experimental underwater habitats developed by the United States Navy in the 1960s to prove the viability of saturation diving and humans living in isolation for extended periods of time. The knowledge gained from the SEALAB expeditions helped advance the science of deep sea diving and rescue, and contributed to the understanding of the psychological and physiological strains humans can endure. USN Aquanauts of note include Robert Sheats, Robin Cook, Alan Shepard, Scott Carpenter and Robert Barth.

In 1966 a B-52 crashed off Palomares, Spain with four hydrogen bombs. USS Hoist, USS Petrel and USS Tringa brought 150 divers who searched down to 350 ft (110 m) without locating the weapons. DSV Alvin located them at a depth of 2,550 feet (780 m).

Still in service, USS Chanticleer was involved with RVN diving operations at Nha Trang during the Vietnam War. Her divers were tasked with a number of salvage assignments. At Chu Lai Combat Base in 1967 Mobile Construction Battalion 71 had an Underwater Construction Team search the Tra Bong River for a missing Squad of Marines that the Marines wanted back no matter what. Their efforts made the Stars and Stripes Pacific edition.

In the 1970s Navy divers took part in Operation Ivy Bells. It was a joint Navy CIA operation. Since the divers did not have the security clearances needed they were given a story for the mission.

In 1975 the first female hard hat diver to be qualified was Donna Tobias. Ten years later Heidemarie Stefanyshyn-Piper became a salvage officer and would become another USN astronaut/diver. Also that year, Seabee diver Robert Dean Stethem was killed by hijackers on TWA Flight 847 at Beirut. The Navy named USS Stethem DDG-63 in his honor.

In the 1980s Mobile Diving Salvage Unit 1 and 2 were created. MDSU 2 has been involved in the salvage of USS Monitor, CSS Georgia, TWA Flight 800, Swiss Air Flight 111 and the Space Shuttles Challenger and Columbia.

Post Vietnam the DOD has made an effort to recover the missing remains of US service personnel. In 2010 MDSU divers searched at Quynh Phuong, Vietnam for the Joint POW/MIA Accounting Command or JPAC. They dove the Mediterranean for WWII remains in 2012. In 2018 MDSU divers were again requested by the Defense POW/MIA Accounting Agency or DPAA, which had absorbed JPAC. The divers were sent to the Palau group where WWII aircraft were known to have gone down.

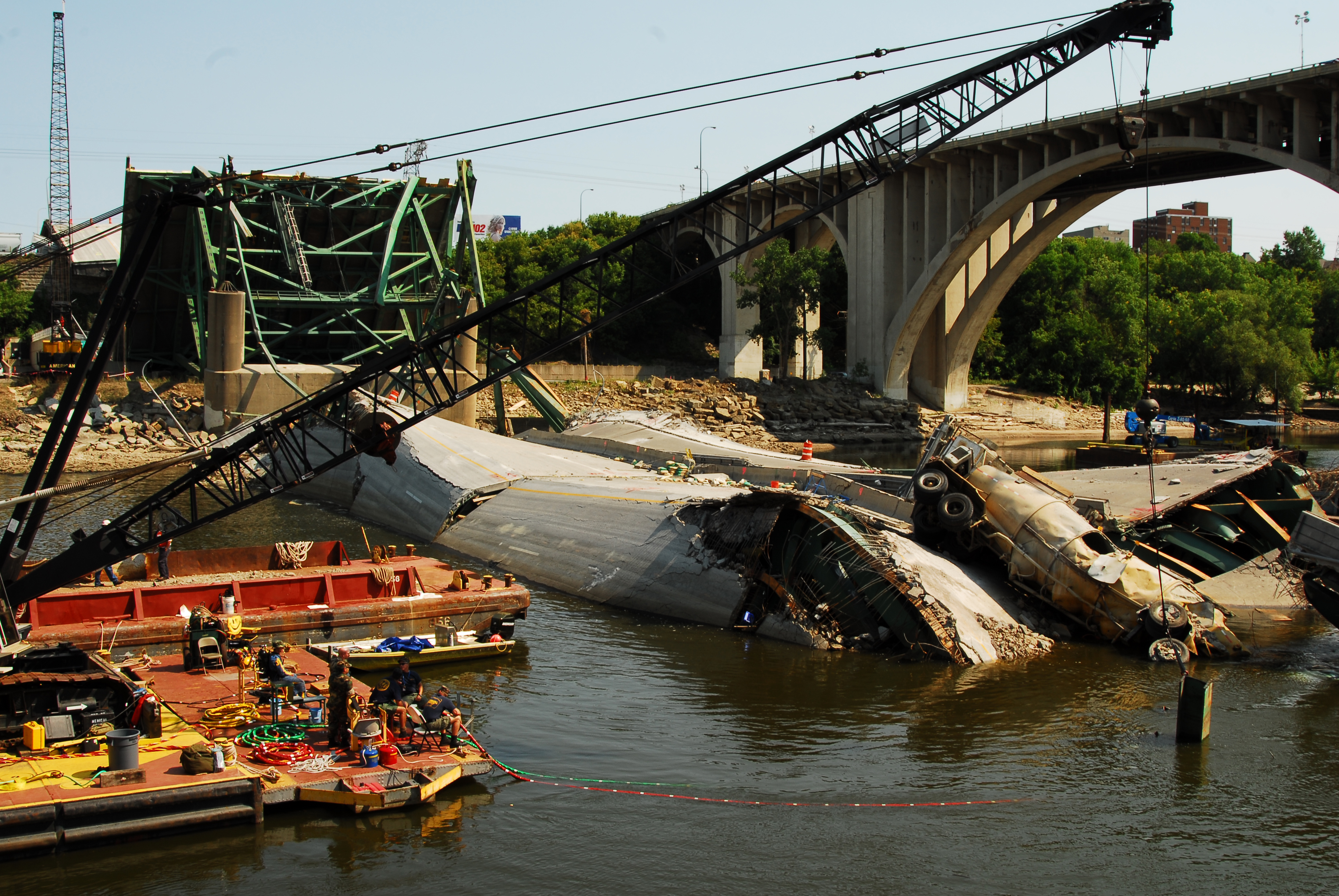
The I 35 bridge collapse in Minneapolis had MDSU divers working with the Army Corps of Engineers.

In 2003 Divers from MDSU 1 and SUPSALV were given the task to remove 2,000,000 US gallons (7,600,000 L) of bunker fuel from the wreck of USS Mississinewa. Hurricane Katrina in 2005 followed by Rita brought disaster recovery to Navy divers. In 2006, the US Navy changed Diving from a "qualification" to a rating of the fleet: Navy Diver (ND). In 2007 divers from the Naval Experimental Diving Unit, Mobile Diving Salvage Unit 2 and US Army worked on the salvage of the Soviet submarine K-77. That same year MDSU divers were sent to Minnesota when the Interstate 35 bridge collapsed into the Mississippi River. In 2011 the divers of Mobile Diving Salvage Unit 1 along with USCG and SUPSALV divers were tasked with the clearance of 72,500 US gallons (274,000 L) of bunker fuel from the wreck of USS Chehalis in Pago Pago Harbor. MDSU 1 was called in 2018 to repeat the action on 250,000 US gallons (950,000 L) on the WWII German cruiser Prinz Eugen. The ship had been sink in the atomic tests of Operation Crossroads.

Distinguished Diver list:

- William Badders Chief Machinist mate
- Carl Brashear Master Chief Boatswains Mate
- Orson Leon Crandall Chief Boatswains Mate
- Owen Francis Patrick Hammerberg Boatswains mate 2nd Class
- James Harper McDonald Chief Metalsmith
- John Mihalowski Chief Torpedoman
- Chief Machinist mate Edward Raymer (was the senior NCO of the first divers sent to Pearl Harbor after the attack, retired with the rank of Commander)
- 29 Divers received the Navy and Marine Corps Medal for having over 100 hours in dive time at Pearl Harbor.
- 2 Divers received the Navy and Marine Corps Medal for diving during gale-force winds, in sub-freezing temps, snow, and possible air attack (including a nine-hour dive in 36 °F (2 °C) water).

== Training and ratings ==
=== The Schools ===
After completion of recruit training or acceptance in the Navy diver program from the Fleet, individuals will go to Naval Training Center, Great Lakes, for Diver Preparation Course (32 training days, including 20 days of basic electrical and engineering courses). Upon completion of the training, candidates will go to Naval Diving and Salvage Training Center (NDSTC) in Panama City, Florida, for Second Class Dive School, which is 70 training days long.

The center has 22 different courses of instruction for roughly 1300 students annually. On average, there are 300 students in training at any given time. The training center conducts approximately ten thousand dives each year.

The NDSTC is divided into Fleet and specialized sections. Regardless of their section, all candidates receive instruction in:

- Basic gas laws as they relate to diving.
- Diving medicine
- Decompression chamber operations
- Scuba gas planning
- Diving physics
- Salvage operations
- Surface-supplied diving systems
- Use of all diving apparatus: Open- and closed-circuit rigs
- Underwater mechanics and tools, and underwater cutting and welding

=== Fleet Training ===
Upon completion of Second Class Dive School service personnel are assigned to one of the Navy Diver Units to develop their diving and salvage skills. Underwater ship repair, salvage, or construction can be done using either SCUBA equipment or a surface-supplied diving system. Training for Diving Medical Officers and diving medical technicians is also part of Fleet training.

=== Advanced Training ===
Many experienced divers return to NDSTC for further course work so they can qualify as First Class divers or as Master divers. The first-class dive school is approximately 12 weeks in length. During training, students are subjected to numerous drills and tests. Some of the subjects include: Hyperbaric Chamber, SCUBA, MK-16 Rebreather, Surface Supplied Air, and Mixed Gas Supervisor. Students are taught how to diagnose diving-related illnesses as well as handling system emergencies. While attending First Class Dive School students are put through Master Diver Evaluations. The evaluations consist of a number of challenging scenarios. Only a select few will qualify. Master diver is a qualification that is difficult to achieve.

=== Specialized Training ===
A Navy diver gets specialized training in demolition and mixed-gas diving.

Navy divers work in extreme conditions, performing various underwater tasks ranging from underwater ship repair, underwater salvage and special operations/special warfare type diving. Because their area of operations are so varied, they can be required to utilize any type of diving equipment for use in any depth or temperature in any part of the world. Certain diving qualification allows NDs to live and work at extreme depths for days or weeks at a time, a discipline known as saturation diving.

Navy enlisted personnel that graduate from second class or first class dive school; and ultimately master diver comprise the Navy Diver rating. NDs are the in-water operators and supervisors for the various mission areas mentioned previously as their primary day to day mission is that of in-water operator and/or supervisor. There are three enlisted diving badges/qualifications in the ND rating:

- Second class diver - E-4 to E-5 personnel. This is the basic diving qualification in the ND rating, awarded upon completion of ND 'A' School (pin awarded upon warfare qualification). Primary duties are to serve as in-water operators during various missions.
- First class diver - E-6 to E-8 personnel. Advanced diving qualification awarded upon completion of ND 'C' School. In addition to duties as a second class diver, first class divers serve as diving and chamber treatment supervisors.
- Master diver - The highest enlisted diving position in the Navy. Awarded upon successful completion of the master diver course which includes exceptionally demanding diving operational problems and acceptance by a master diver board. Oversees diving operations and train/qualify diving supervisors.

Personnel in the CEC Seabee ratings can qualify as underwater construction technician (UCT). Like other Navy divers, UCTs are primary in-water operators that conduct underwater construction and demolitions. The three qualification that the various rate can obtain with are as follows: Basic Underwater Construction Technician/ NEC 5932 (2nd Class Diver), Advanced Underwater Construction Technician/ NEC 5931 (1st Class Diver), and Master Underwater Construction Technician/ NEC 5933 (Master diver).

Navy hospital corpsmen can qualify as a diving medical technician (DMT), where they are given training in medical aspects of diving. Primary responsibilities are to provide medical advice and treatment to diving personnel. They also instruct members of the diving team in first aid procedures when the presence of diving medical personnel is indicated.

Additionally, there is a scuba diver qualification primarily for those stationed on submarines to serve as sub divers in a limited capacity. Navy scuba divers are also trained at NDSTC at a 5-week course. Their duties consist primarily of conducting occasional inspections on the submarine they are stationed on. Scuba divers maintain their traditional Navy rating such as ET or MM; their diving Navy Enlisted Classification (NEC) is a collateral duty, not their primary one.

== U.S. navy diver physical fitness test ==
Diving medical personnel evaluate the fitness of divers before operations begin and are prepared to handle any emergencies which might arise. They also observe the condition of other support personnel and are alert for signs of fatigue, overexposure, and heat exhaustion. The physical fitness test has been shown to be a poor predictor of job task performance.

The test consists of the following carried out in the order given:

1. Swim 500 yards (or 450 m) utilizing only combat side stroke or breast stroke within 12 minutes 30 seconds (candidates are allowed to push off the sides when turning. However, if the candidate uses the bottom to stand or rest, they will fail the test).
2. 10-minute rest period.
3. Perform 50 push-ups within 2 minutes (Upper arms must parallel deck at dip and arms locked out at the top of the rep).
4. 2-minute rest period.
5. Perform 50 sit-ups within 2 minutes (Bent knees. Candidates hands must stay on the collarbone and the elbows must touch the knees).
6. 2-minute rest period.
7. Perform 6 pull-ups within 2 minutes (no kipping or swinging is allowed and the chin must clear the top of the bar on each repetition).
8. 10-minute rest period.
9. Run 1.5 miles (2.414 km) within 12 minutes 30 seconds.

Note: The times and quantities listed are for passing the screening test only. Each candidate's scores are submitted and the candidates with the top scores along with ASVAB exam scores will be selected and given a navy diver contract. Passing the physical fitness test is necessary but by no means guarantees the candidate a contract.

== Health impact ==
A study published in 2011 by the Navy Experimental Diving Unit reviewed the long-term health impact on the U.S. Navy diving population. The divers surveyed participated as divers for an average of 18 years out of their average 24 active duty years. Sixty percent of the divers surveyed were receiving disability compensation. One in seven of the divers had experienced neurologic symptoms of decompression sickness, with 41% of the divers experiencing one or more of the nine diving injuries surveyed. Seven percent of the surveyed divers had undergone a joint replacement. Eighty-six percent of the divers rated their health as "Excellent, Very Good, or Good". When compared to the general population, the divers showed better mental health but poorer physical health.

== Ratings and enlisted designators ==
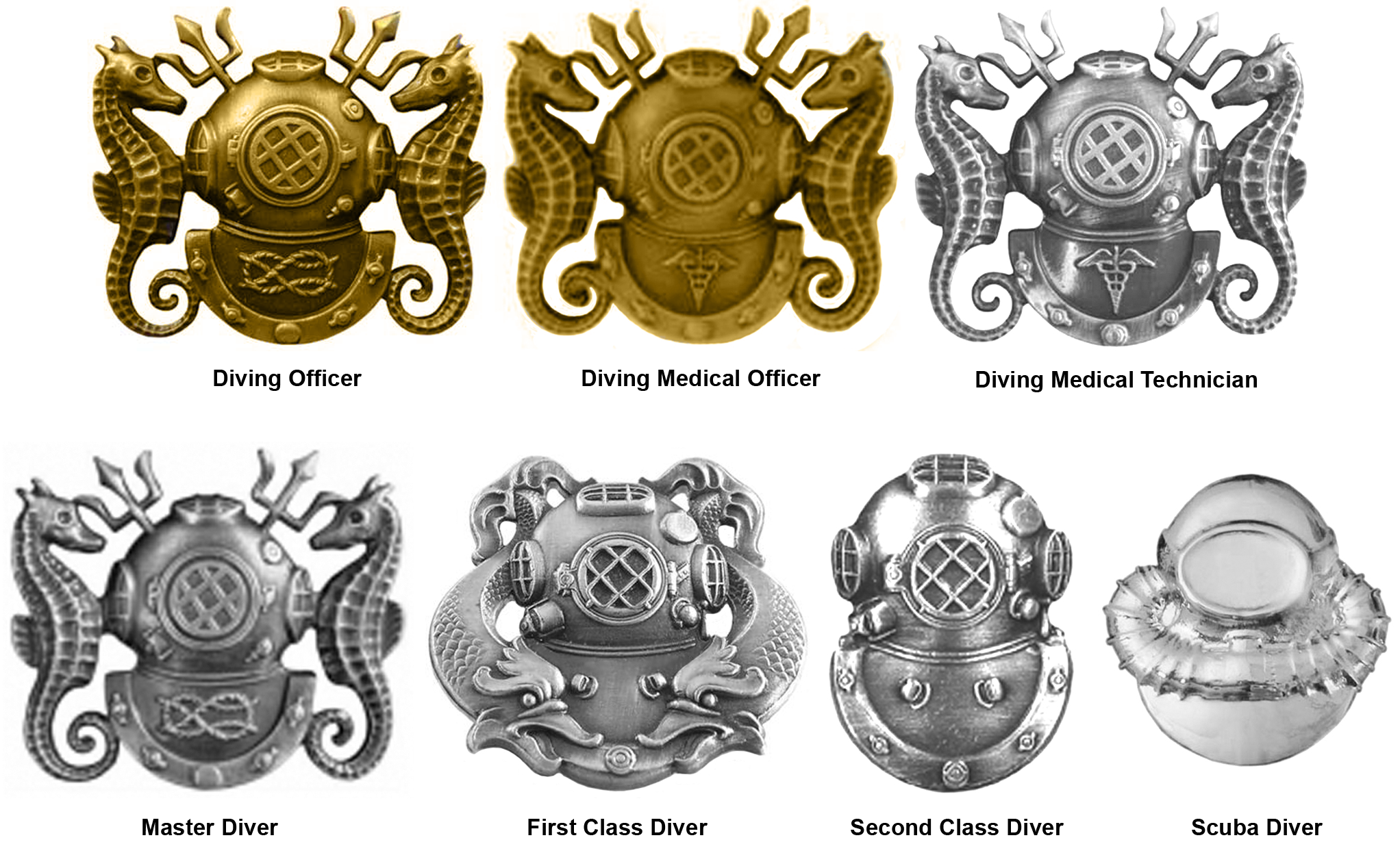

The navy diver rating was announced in Naval Administration Message 003/06 and consists of sailors with the following NECs:

- NEC 5341 – master diver
- NEC 5342 – first class diver
- NEC 5343 – second class diver

The effective date of the ND rating was June 1, 2006 for E6-E9 (senior non-commissioned officers), and October 1, 2006, for E1-E5 junior enlisted.

- E4 (ND3) – Navy diver third class
- E5 (ND2) – Navy diver second class
- E6 (ND1) – Navy diver first class
- E7 (NDC) – Chief Navy diver
- E8 (NDCS) – Senior Chief Navy diver
- E9 (NDCM) – Master Chief Navy diver

== Officer designators ==
Designation as a Diving Officer for selected:MILPERSMAN 1210-140

- Unrestricted Line (117X, 112X)
- Restricted Line/Staff Corps (146X, 144X, 210X, 510X)
- Limited Duty (61XX, 648X, 653X)
- Warrant (71XX, 72XX, 748X, 753X)
- 1440 – Engineering Duty (restricted line) Officer
- 510x – Civil Engineer Corps (staff) Officer
- 720x – Diving (warrant) Officer
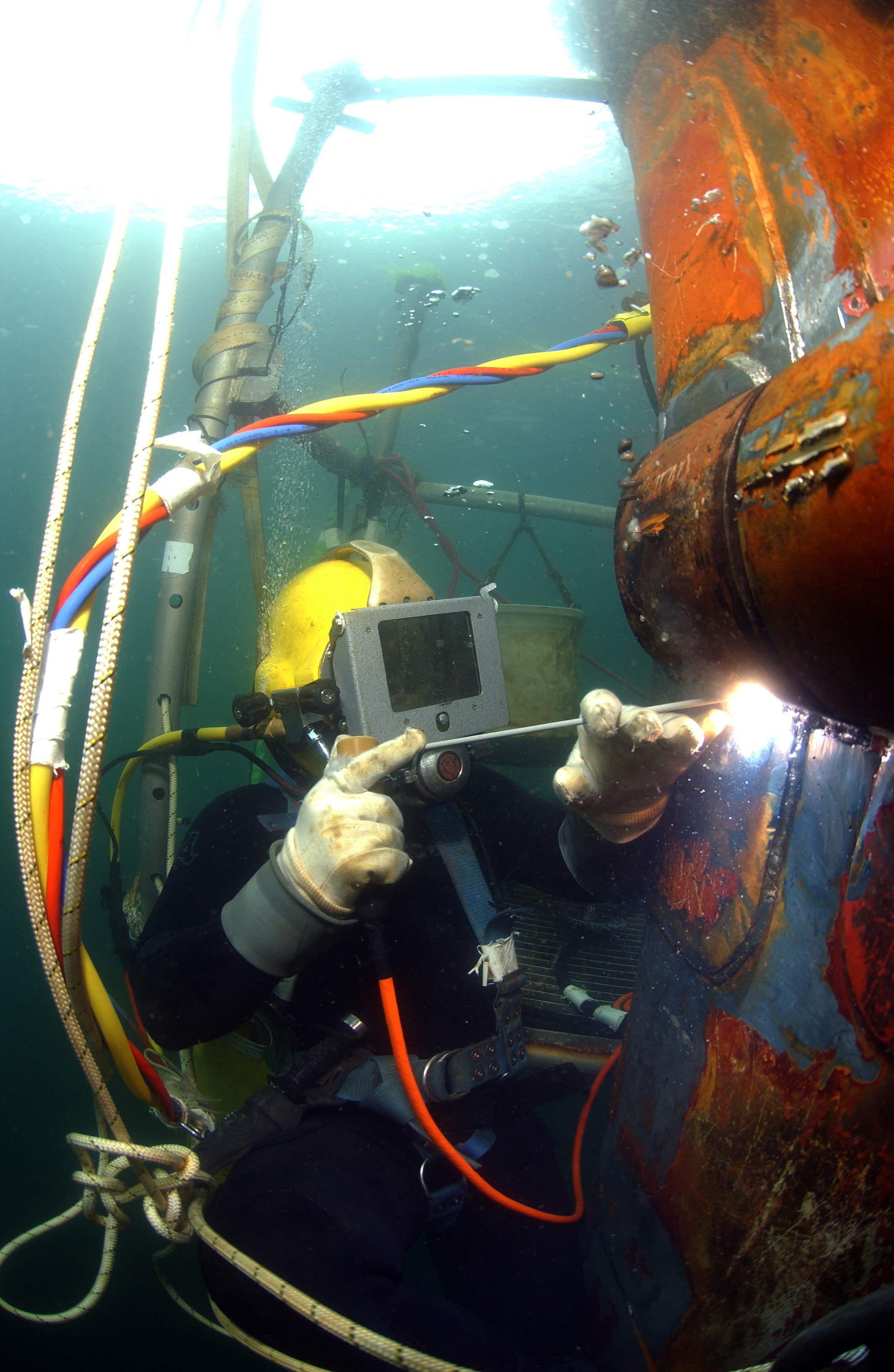
Underwater welding

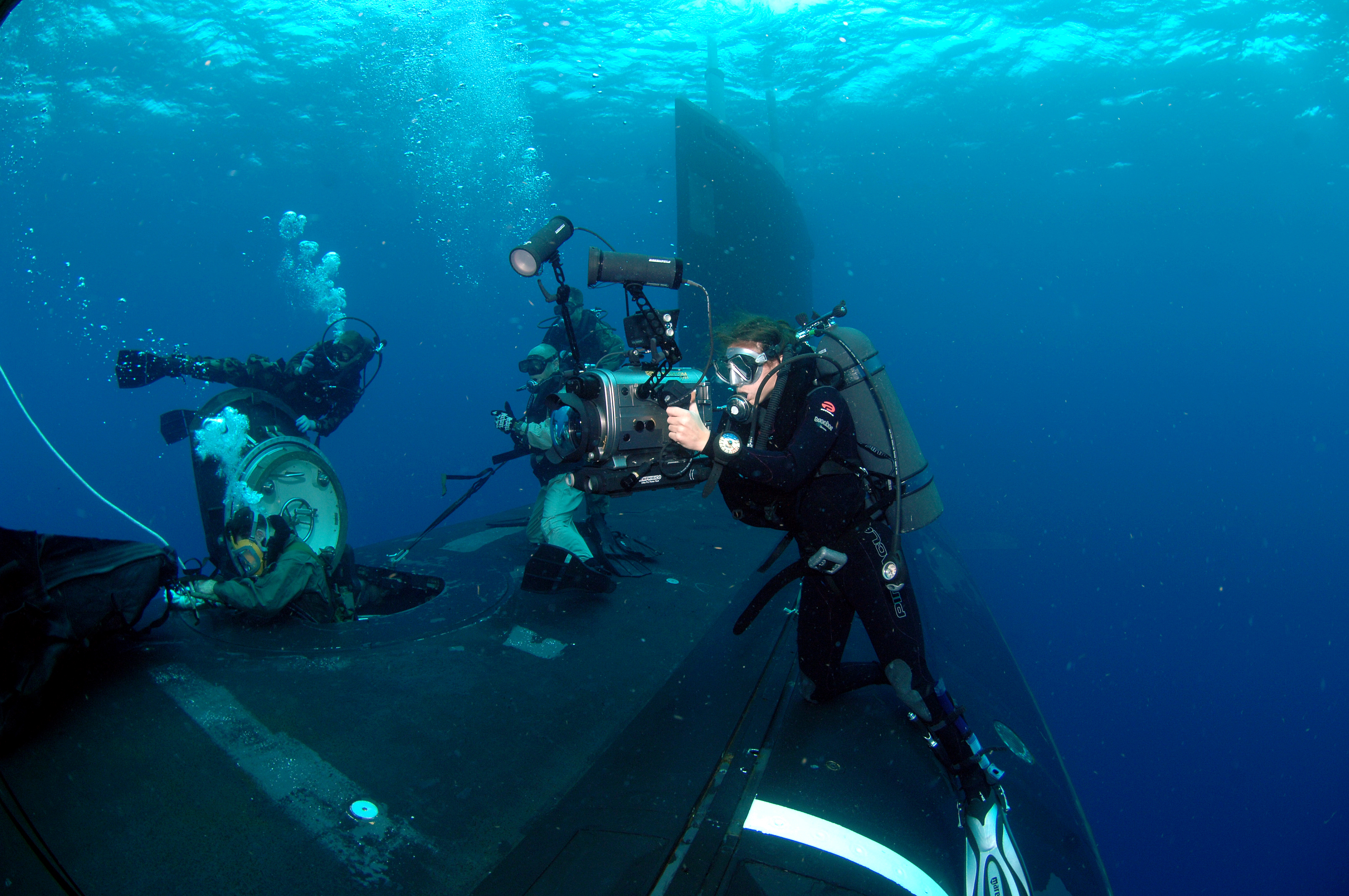
SEAL operations

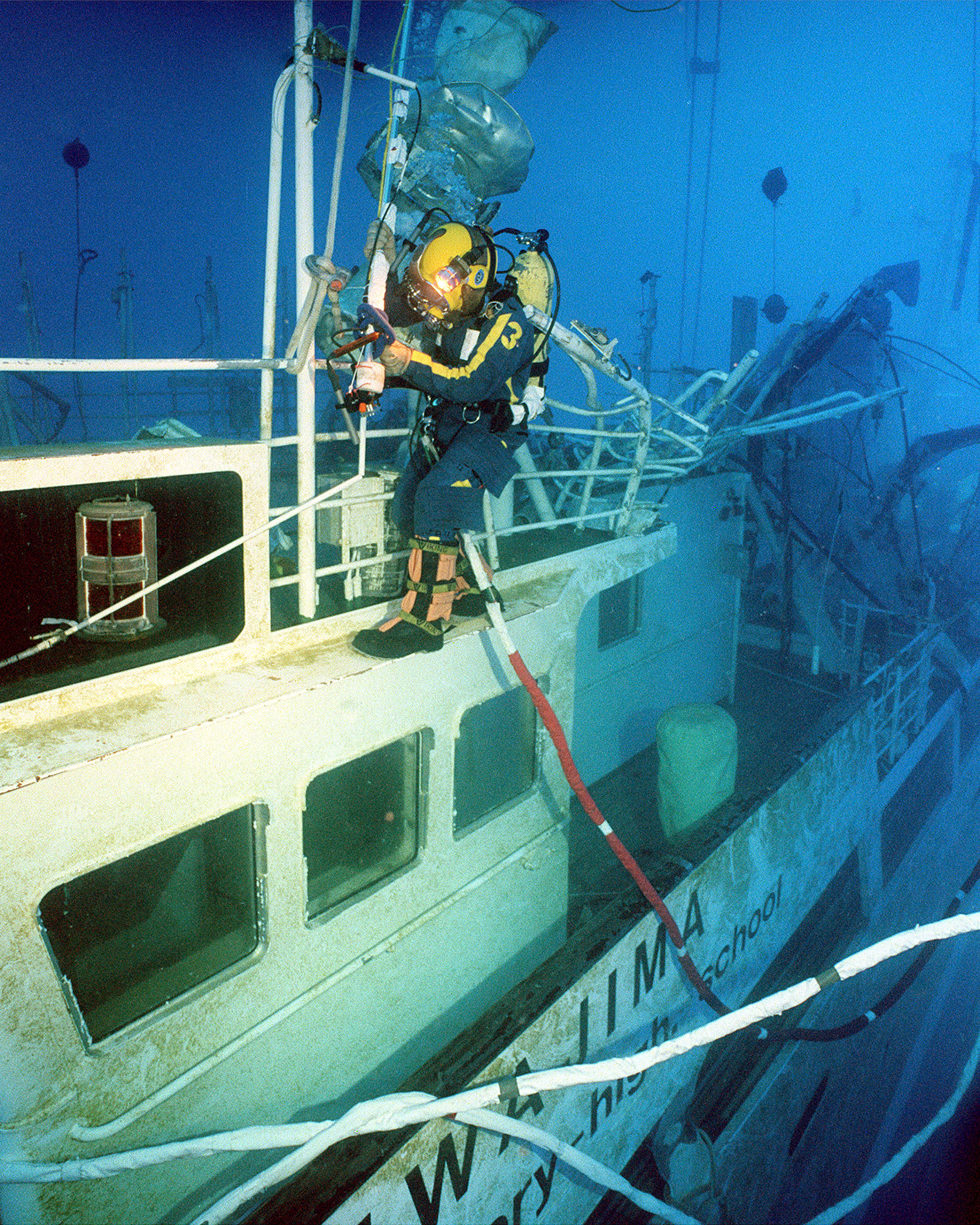
Salvage Operations

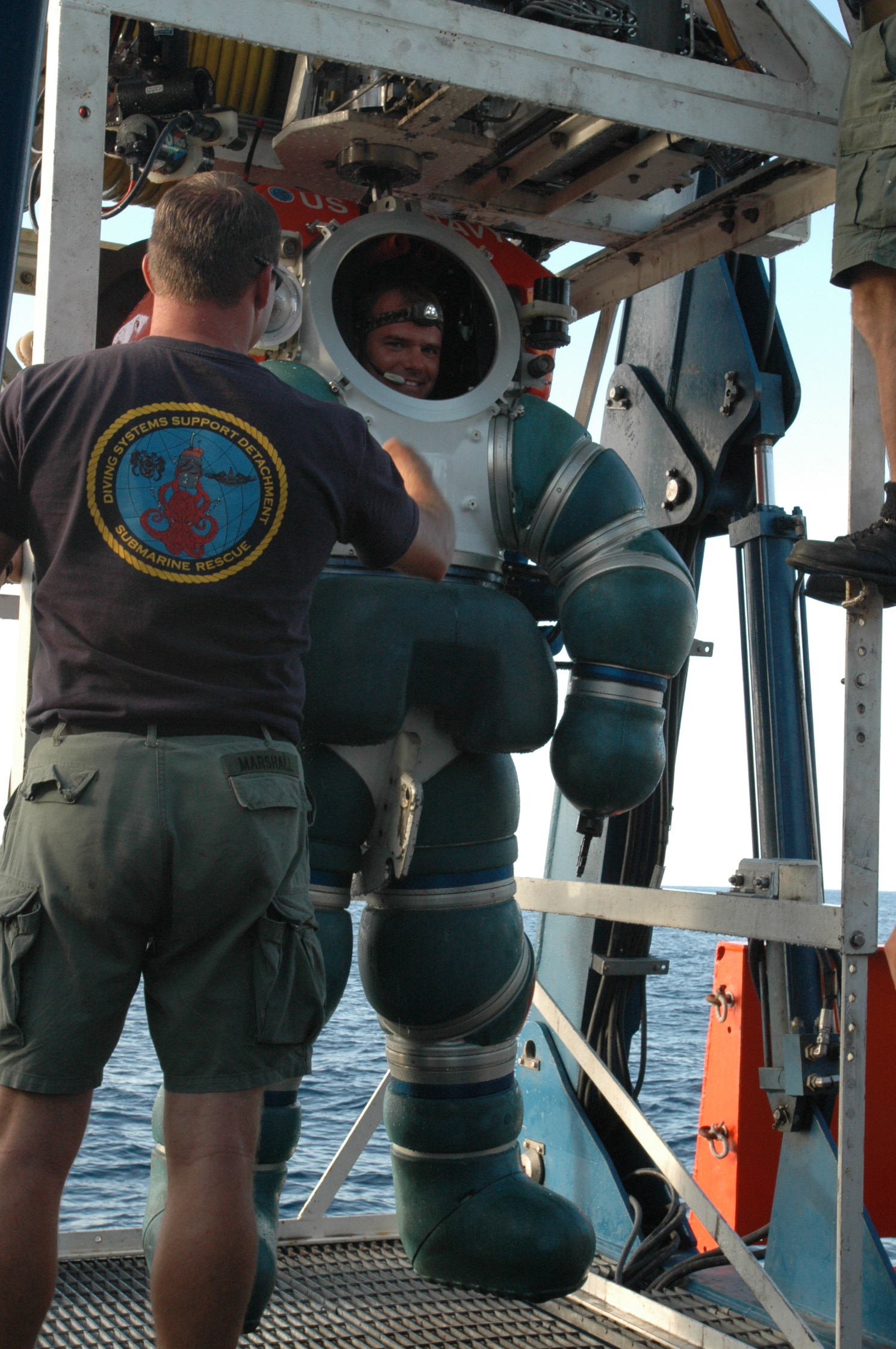
Atmospheric diving suit

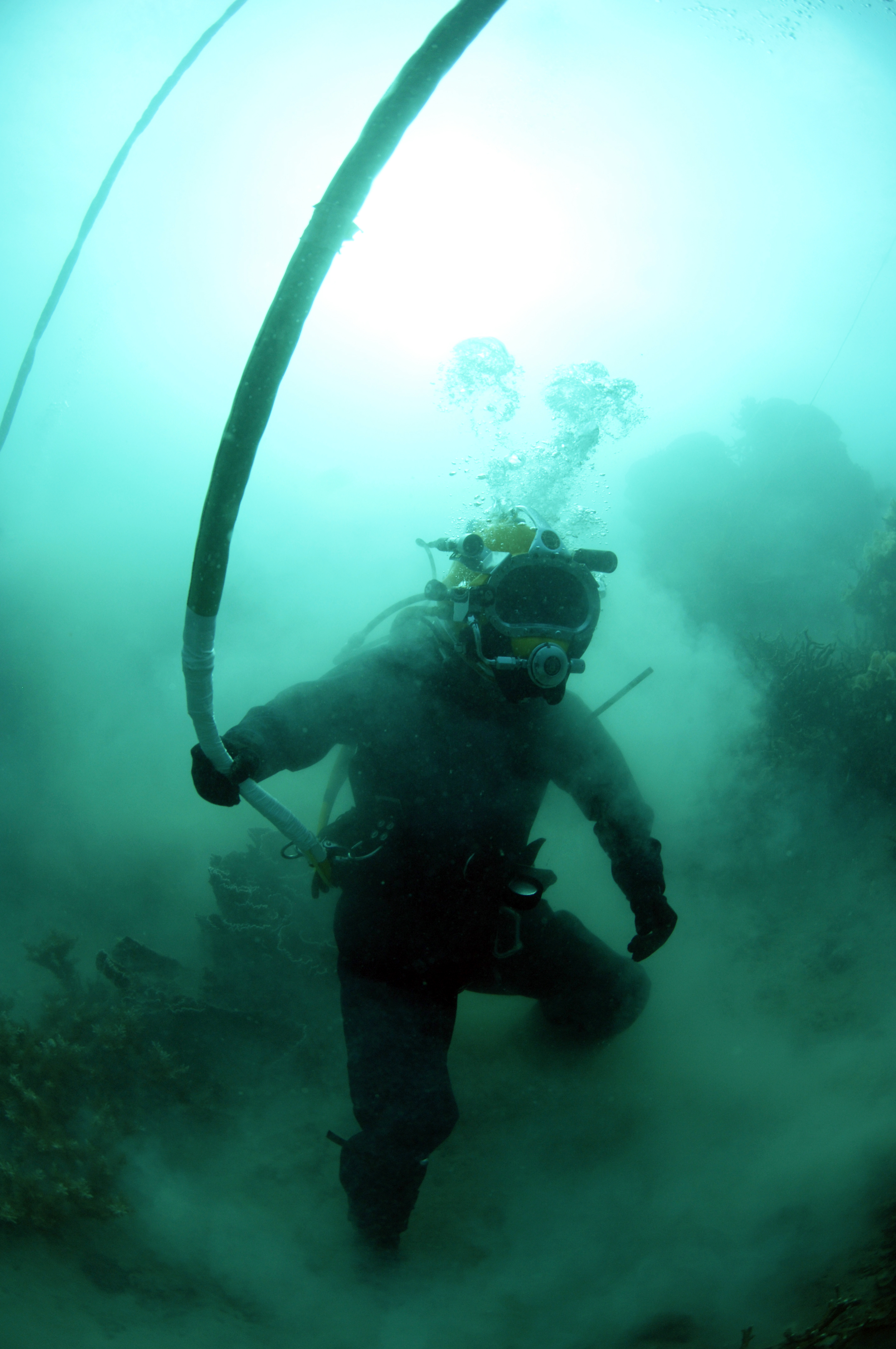
Harbor clearance

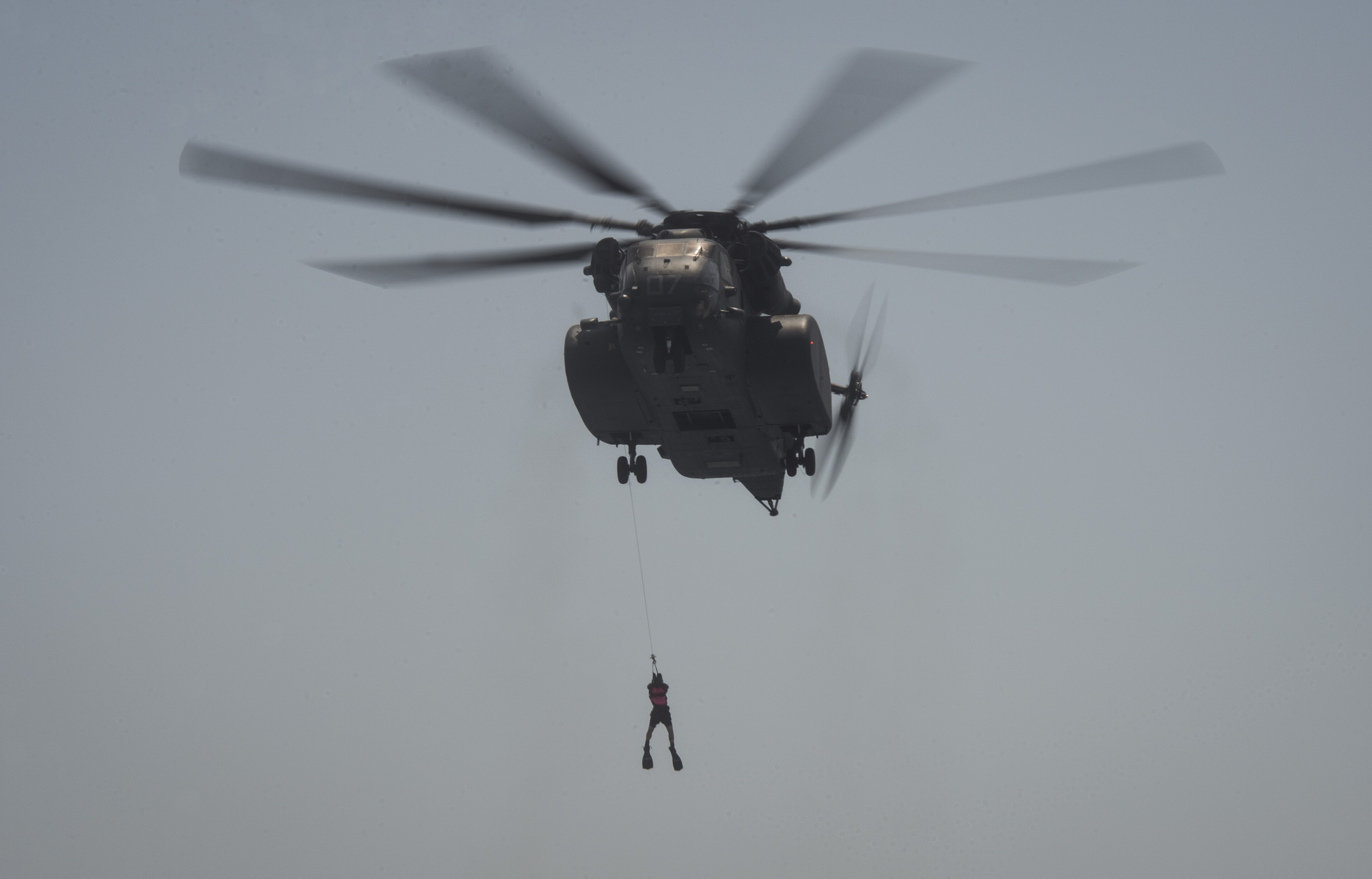
EOD Cast and recovery exercise

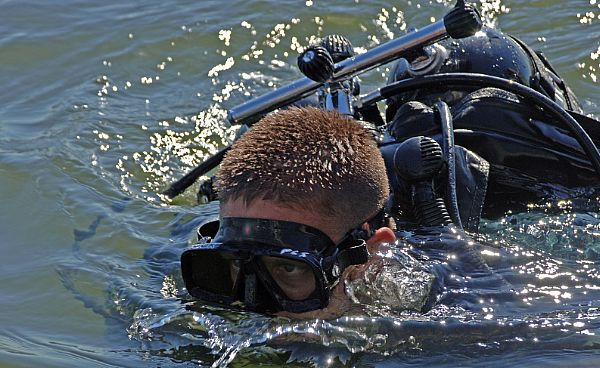
SCUBA

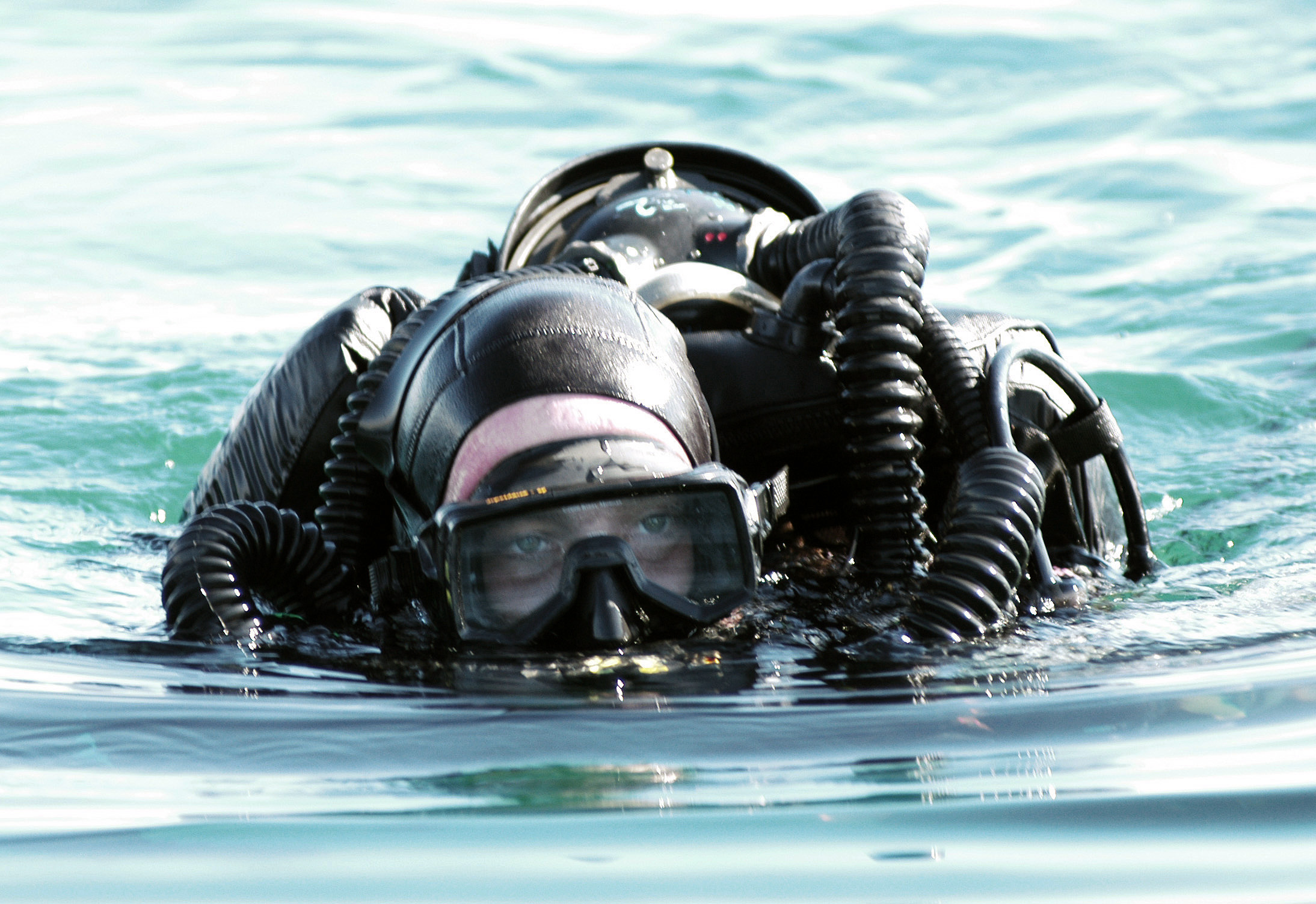
Closed circuit

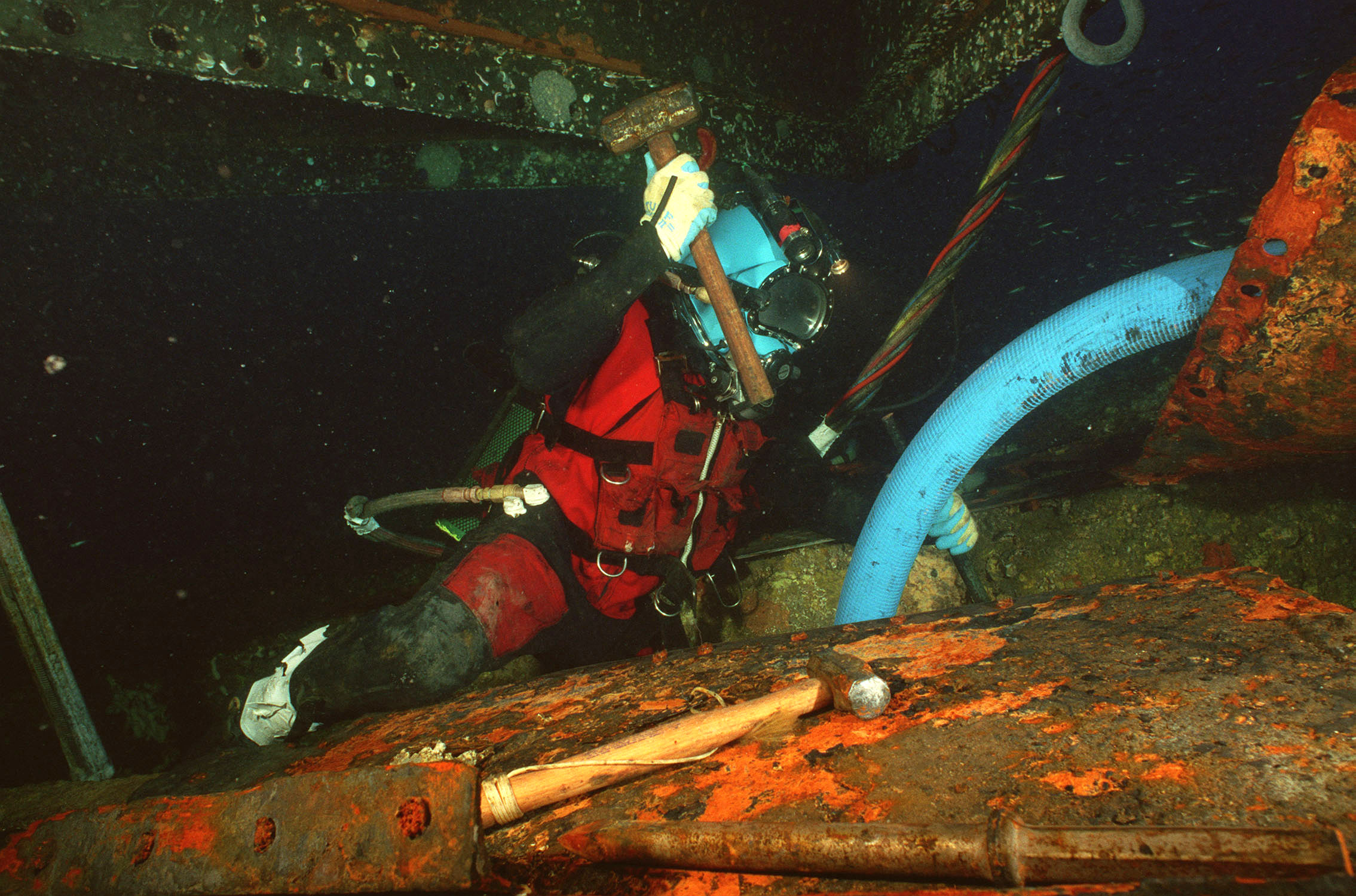
Saturation diving

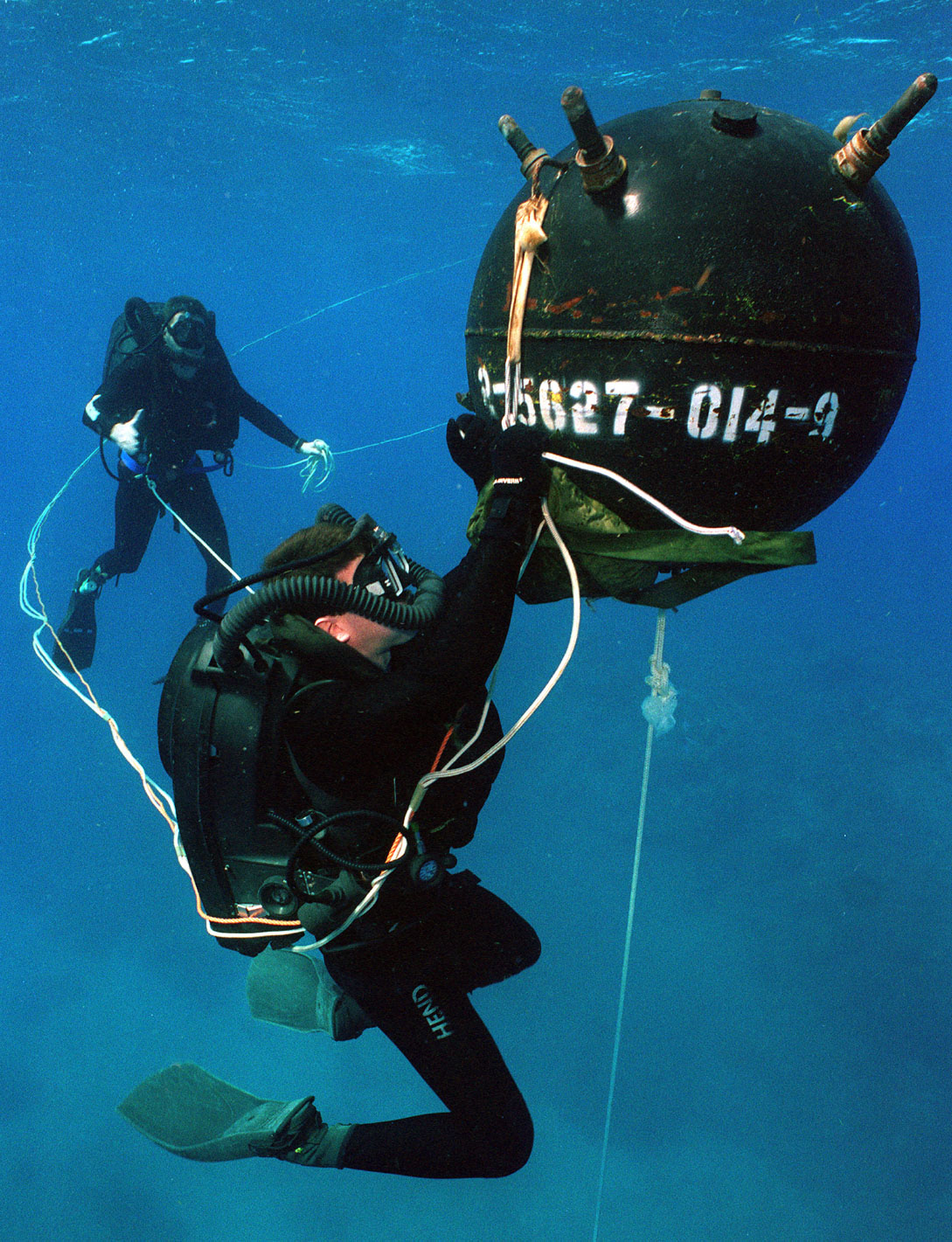
Explosive ordnance disposal

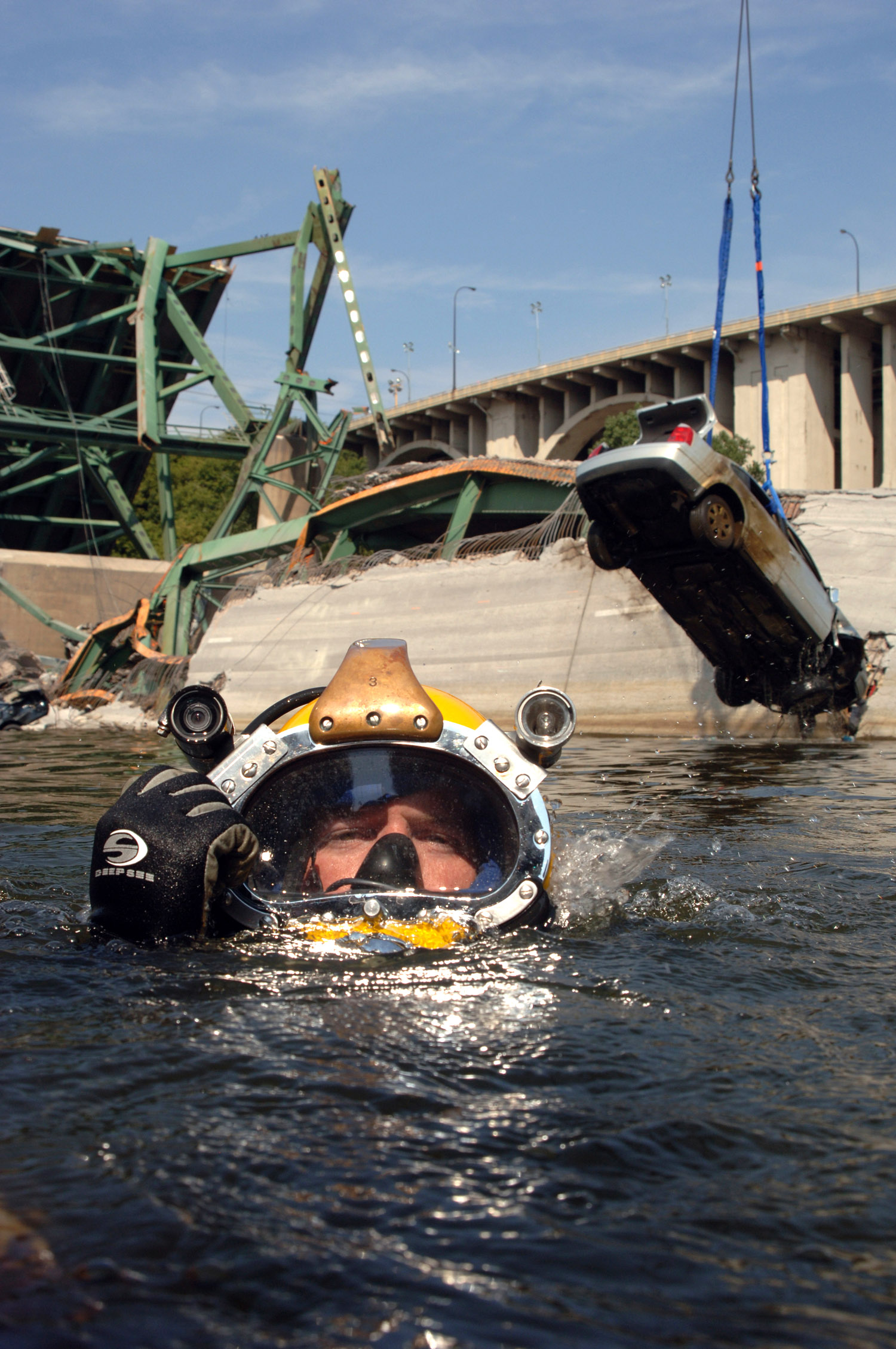
Disaster recovery

== See also ==
- Robert Croft (free dive pioneer)
- Clearance diver
- Diving gear
- Diving hand signals
- Royal Navy ships diver
- Underwater Construction Teams
- UDT
- Uniformed services diver insignia (United States) – Qualification badges of the uniformed services of the U.S.
- Military diving – Underwater diving in a military context by members of an armed force
- United States military divers – Underwater divers employed by the US armed forces
