= John Mihalowski =

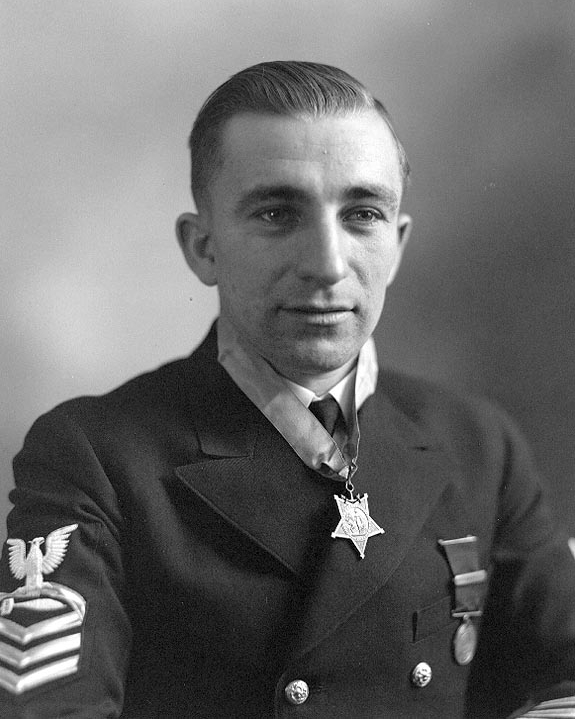
- Chief Torpedoman John Mihalowski, January 19, 1940
- Born: August 12, 1911; Worcester, Massachusetts
- Died: October 29, 1993 (aged 82); Pinellas County, Florida
- Burial place: Serenity Gardens Memorial Park, Largo, Florida
- Military career
- Allegiance: United States of America
- Branch: United States Navy
- Service years: 1927 - c. 1958
- Rank: Lieutenant Commander
- Units: USS Falcon (ASR-2); USS Shackle (ARS-9); USS Gypsy (ARS(D)-1)
- Conflicts: World War II
- Awards: Medal of Honor

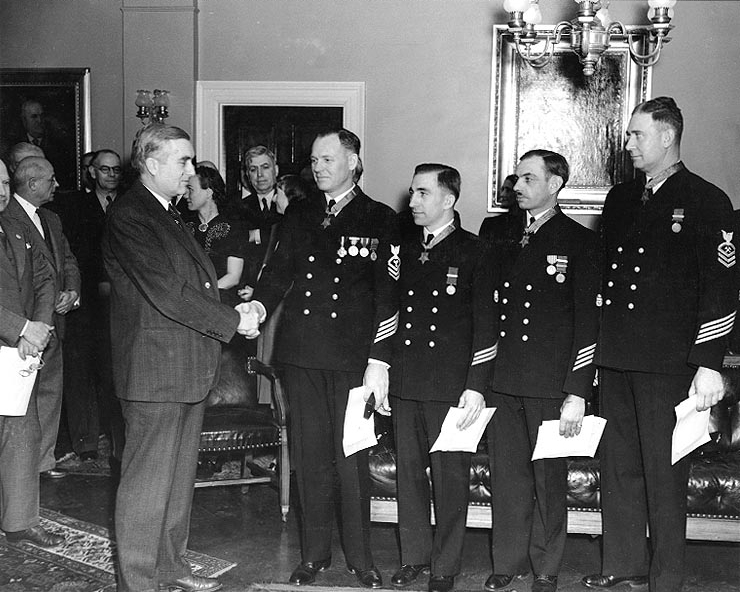
Secretary of the Navy Charles Edison congratulates four divers of the Squalus rescue and salvage operations after presenting them with Medals of Honor. The four men are (from left to right) William Badders, John Mihalowski, Orson L. Crandall, and James H. McDonald

John Mihalowski (August 12, 1911 – October 29, 1993) was a United States Navy diver and a recipient of America's highest military decoration—the Medal of Honor.

== Biography ==
John Mihalowski was born in Worcester, Massachusetts, the son of Polish immigrants; the surname was also spelled Michalowski.

He enlisted in the Navy in December 1927, rising to the rank of Chief Torpedoman during the next decade. Trained as a diver in 1932-33, he served with the Experimental Diving Unit from 1933 to 1937 and then as a member of the crew of USS Falcon (ASR-2) into 1941. While serving in the Falcon, he played an important role in the rescue of survivors of USS Sailfish (SS-192) and the subsequent salvage of that submarine in 1939. For his conduct during that effort, Chief Torpedoman Mihalowski was awarded the Medal of Honor. Three other divers also received Medals of Honor for assisting in the Squalus rescue and salvage. The four men were presented with their medals during a ceremony at the Navy Department offices on January 19, 1940.

In 1942, Mihalowski was appointed a warrant officer and became a commissioned officer later in World War II. He participated in rescue and salvage operations on six tank landing ships that had exploded in Pearl Harbor in 1944, and, while executive officer of USS Shackle (ARS-9), on damaged ships during the Battle of Okinawa in 1945. Following the war, he took part in the harbor clearance in Japan and in salvage efforts during the 1946 Operation Crossroads atomic bomb tests at Bikini Atoll. He was executive officer of the salvage lifting vessel USS Gypsy (ARS(D)-1) from 1947 to 1948, before transferring to the Fleet Reserve in January 1948.

Recalled to active duty in September 1950 as a Chief Torpedoman, Mihalowski was reinstated as a Lieutenant the following year. He was assigned to the Naval Gun Factory, Washington, D.C., in 1952 and was promoted to the rank of Lieutenant Commander in February 1954. LCdr. John Mihalowski retired from active naval service in about 1958.

Mihalowski died at age 82 or and was buried in Serenity Gardens Memorial Park, Largo, Florida.

== Medal of Honor citation ==
Chief Torpedoman Mihalowski's official Medal of Honor citation reads:

For extraordinary heroism in the line of his profession during the rescue and salvage operations following the sinking of the U.S.S. Squalus on 23 May 1939. Mihalowski, as a member of the rescue chamber crew, made the last extremely hazardous trip of the rescue chamber to attempt to rescue any possible survivors in the flooded after portion of the Squalus. He was fully aware of the great danger involved, in that, if he and the other member of the crew became incapacitated, there was no way in which either could be rescued. During the salvage operations Mihalowski made important and difficult dives under the most hazardous conditions. His outstanding performance of duty contributed much to the success of the operations and characterizes conduct far above and beyond the ordinary call of duty.

== See also ==
- List of Medal of Honor recipients
- List of Medal of Honor recipients during Peacetime
