= James Harper McDonald =

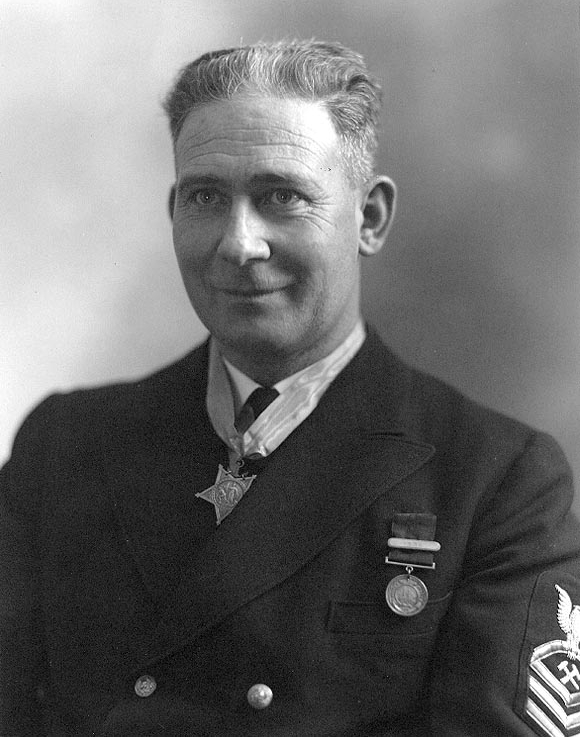
- Chief Metalsmith James H. McDonald, January 19, 1940, just after being presented with the Medal of Honor
- Born: July 15, 1900; New Mand, Scotland
- Died: December 29, 1973 (aged 73)
- Burial place: Fishing Creek Cemetery, Roulette, Pennsylvania
- Military career
- Allegiance: United States
- Branch: United States Navy
- Service years: 1920 - c. 1923; 1926 - c. 1951
- Rank: Lieutenant
- Awards: Medal of Honor

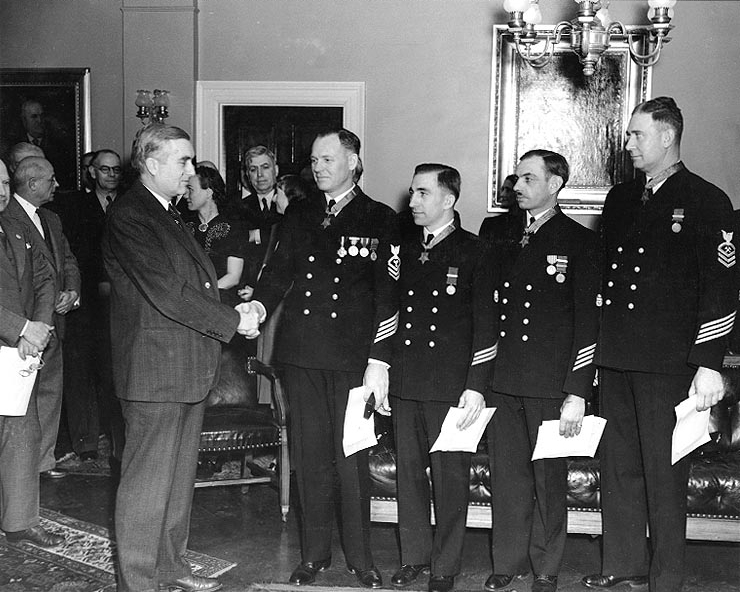
Secretary Edison congratulates four divers of the Squalus salvage operation after presenting them with Medals of Honor. The four men are (from left to right) Badders, Mihalowski, Crandall, and McDonald

James Harper McDonald (July 15, 1900 – December 29, 1973) was a United States Navy diver and a recipient of America's highest military decoration—the Medal of Honor—for his actions during the salvage of the sunken submarine USS Sailfish.

== Biography ==
James McDonald enlisted in the U.S. Navy in October 1920, was discharged three years later and reenlisted in February 1926. Trained as a metalsmith, and later as a diver, he was commended in 1928 and 1930 for his excellent diving work.He was designated a Master Diver in October 1934. From May to September 1939, he was heavily involved in rescue and salvage efforts on the USS Squalus. Four members of the salvage team were awarded the Medal of Honor for their actions during that operation. James McDonald, then a Chief Metalsmith, and three fellow divers (Chief Machinist's Mate William Badders, Chief Torpedoman John Mihalowski, and Chief Boatswain's Mate Orson L. Crandall) received their Medals of Honor from Secretary of the Navy Charles Edison .This happened during a ceremony held at the Navy Department offices on January 19, 1940.

Continuing his Naval service into World War II, McDonald became a commissioned officer. He retired after the war with the rank of Lieutenant.

James Harper McDonald died at the age of 73 and was buried in Fishing Creek Cemetery, Roulette, Pennsylvania.

== Medal of Honor citation ==
Chief Metalsmith McDonald's official Medal of Honor citation reads:

For extraordinary heroism in the line of his profession as a Master Diver throughout the rescue and salvage operations following the sinking of the U.S.S. Squalus on 23 May 1939. His leadership, masterly skill, general efficiency and untiring devotion to duty in directing diving operations, and in making important and difficult dives under the most hazardous conditions, characterize conduct far above and beyond the ordinary call of duty.

== See also ==
- List of Medal of Honor recipients
- List of Medal of Honor recipients during Peacetime
