= Orson Leon Crandall =

United States Navy Medal of Honor recipient (1903–1960)

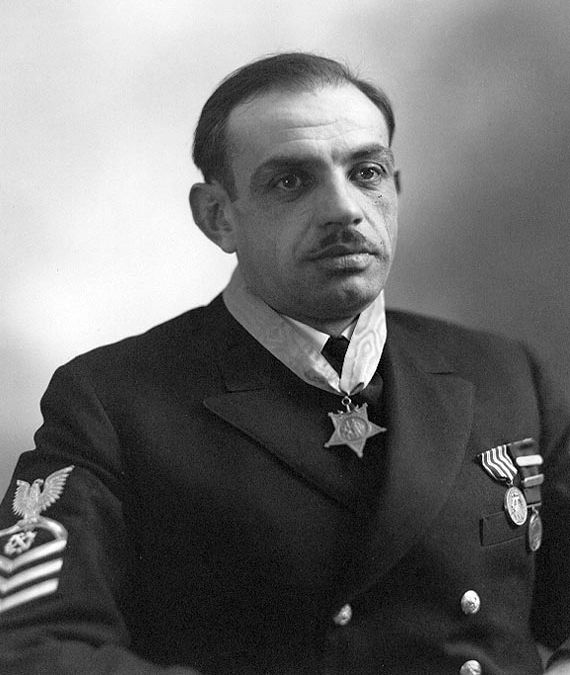
- Chief Boatswain's Mate Orson L. Crandall, January 19, 1940
- Born: February 2, 1903; Saint Joseph, Missouri, U.S.
- Died: May 10, 1960 (aged 57); St. Petersburg, Florida, U.S.
- Burial place: Arlington National Cemetery
- Military career
- Allegiance: United States
- Branch: United States Navy
- Service years: 1922–1952
- Rank: Lieutenant
- Unit: USS Falcon (ASR-2)
- Awards: Medal of Honor

Orson Leon Crandall (February 2, 1903 – May 10, 1960) was a United States Navy diver and a recipient of America's highest military decoration - the Medal of Honor.

== Biography ==
Orson Crandall was born on February 2, 1903, in Saint Joseph, Missouri. He enlisted in the Navy from Connecticut in June 1922, serving in several ships over the next decade. Trained as a diver in 1932–33 and designated a Master Diver in March 1939, he was serving in USS Falcon (ASR-2) when she supported the rescue and salvage effort on the sunken submarine USS Squalus from May to September 1939. Chief Boatswain's Mate Crandall was awarded the Medal of Honor for his actions as Master Diver during that operation.

During World War II, Crandall became a commissioned officer and served in a variety of salvage and diving-related positions. He transferred to the Fleet Reserve in June 1946 and retired in December 1952.

Lieutenant Orson L. Crandall died on May 10, 1960, and was buried in Arlington National Cemetery in Arlington County, Virginia.

== Namesake ==
USS Crandall (YHLC-2), 1967–1993, was named in honor of Lieutenant Crandall.

== Medal of Honor citation ==
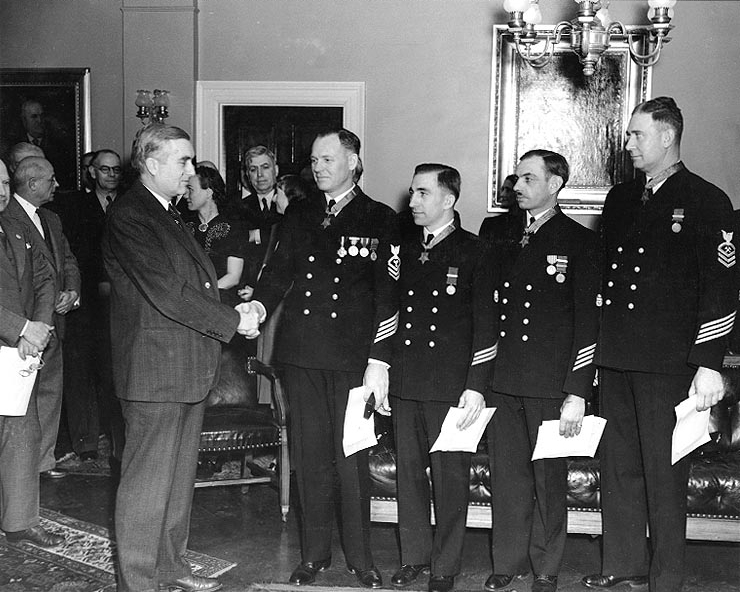
Secretary of the Navy Charles Edison congratulates four divers of the Squalus rescue and salvage operations after presenting them with Medals of Honor. The four men are (from left to right) William Badders, John Mihalowski, Orson L. Crandall, and James H. McDonald

Orson Crandall's official Medal of Honor citation is as follows:

For extraordinary heroism in the line of his profession as a master diver throughout the rescue and salvage operations following the sinking of the U.S.S. Squalus on 23 May 1939. His leadership and devotion to duty in directing diving operations and in making important and difficult dives under the most hazardous conditions characterize conduct far above and beyond the ordinary call of duty.

== See also ==
- List of Medal of Honor recipients
- List of Medal of Honor recipients during Peacetime
