= William Badders =

United States Navy Medal of Honor recipient

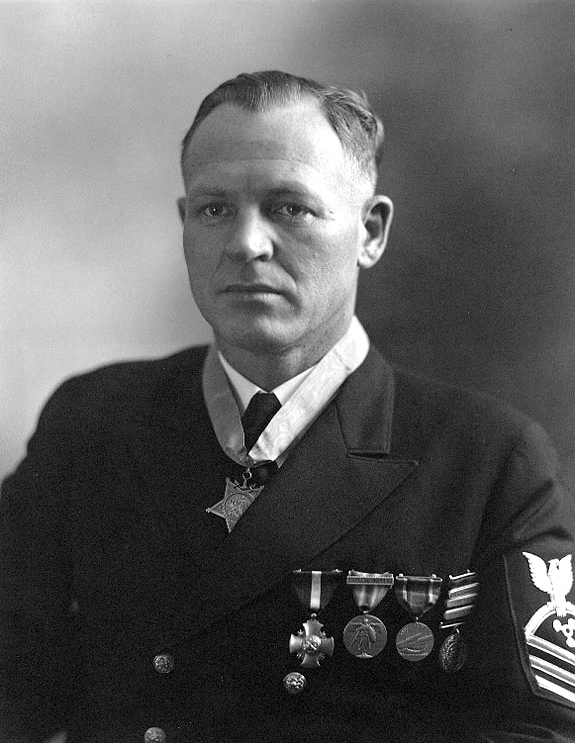
- Badders in January 1940
- Born: September 15, 1901; Harrisburg, Illinois, U.S.
- Died: November 23, 1986 (aged 85); Alameda County, California, U.S.
- Burial place: San Francisco National Cemetery; San Francisco, California, U.S.
- Military career
- Allegiance: United States of America
- Branch: United States Navy
- Service years: 1918–1919 (U.S. Naval Reserve); 1919–1940 (U.S. Navy)
- Rank: Chief Machinist's Mate
- Awards: Medal of Honor; Navy Cross; World War I Victory Medal; Yangtse River Patrol Service Medal

William Badders (September 15, 1901 – November 23, 1986) was a diver in the United States Navy and a recipient of the highest American military decoration, the Medal of Honor, as well as the Navy Cross.

== Early life and career ==
William Badders was born in Harrisburg, Illinois, on September 15, 1901. He enrolled in the U.S. Naval Reserve in August 1918 and transferred to the regular Navy in December 1919. Later trained as a diver, Badders was awarded the Navy Cross for "extraordinary heroism and devotion to duty" during the salvage of USS S-51 (SS-162) in 1926. He was designated a Master Diver in April 1931 and received commendations for his diving work in salvaging USS S-4 (SS-109) in 1928 and the Japanese steamship Kaku Maru in 1932, and for clearing the propeller of USS Bittern (AM-36) at sea in 1933.

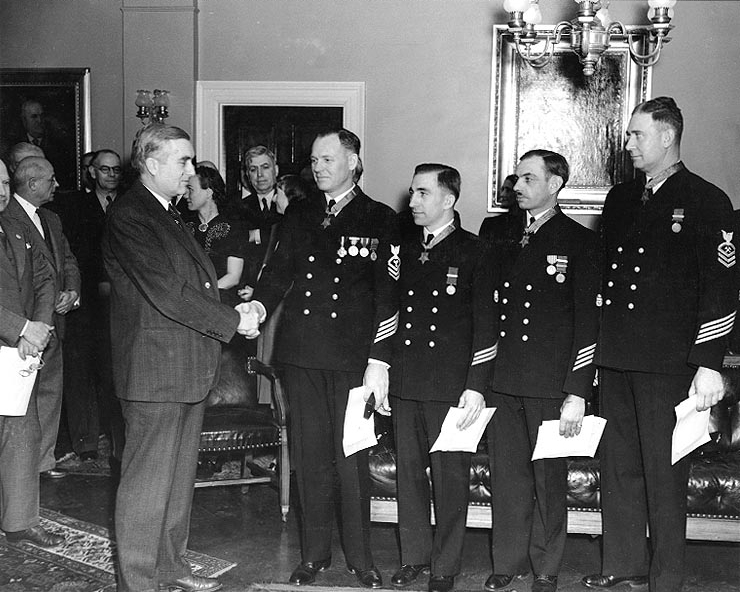
Secretary of the Navy Charles Edison congratulates four divers of the Squalus rescue and salvage operations after presenting them with Medals of Honor. The four men are (from left to right) William Badders, John Mihalowski, Orson L. Crandall, and James H. McDonald

Chief Machinist's Mate Badders was awarded the Medal of Honor for heroism during the rescue of survivors of USS Squalus (SS-192) and subsequent salvage of that submarine in 1939. He was Senior Member of the rescue chamber crew and served as a diver during the salvage effort. He transferred to the Fleet Reserve in March 1940.

William Badders died on November 23, 1986, in Alameda County, California, and was buried in the San Francisco National Cemetery in San Francisco, California.

== Awards ==
=== Medal of Honor citation ===
William Badders' official Navy Medal of Honor citation is as follows: I Calvin Coolidge

The President of the United States in the name of The Congress takes pleasure in presenting the MEDAL OF HONOR to

WILLIAM BADDERS
NAVY
for service as set forth in the following:

CITATION:

For extraordinary heroism in the line of his profession as a Diver with the Submarine and Rescue Salvage Unit, U.S.S. Falcon, during the rescue and salvage operations following the sinking of the U.S.S. Squalus on 1939-05-13. During the rescue operations, Chief Machinist's Mate William Badders, as senior member of the rescue chamber crew, made the last extremely hazardous trip of the rescue chamber to attempt to rescue any possible survivors in the flooded after portion of the Squalus. Will was fully aware of the great danger involved in that if he and his assistant became incapacitated, there was no way in which either could be rescued. During the salvage operations, Chief Machinist's Mate William Badders made important and difficult dives under the most hazardous conditions. His outstanding performance of duty contributed much to the success of the operations and characterizes conduct far above and beyond the ordinary call of duty.

=== Navy Cross Citation ===
I, Calvin Coolidge, The President of the United States of America takes pleasure in presenting the Navy Cross to Engineman First Class William Badders, United States Navy, for extraordinary heroism and devotion to duty as a Diver, on the occasion of the salvaging of the U.S.S. S-51, from 16 October 1925 to 8 July 1926. Engineman First Class William Badders actions during this operation were in keeping with the highest traditions of the United States Naval Service.

=== Navy and Marine Corps Medal Citation ===
I Calvin Coolidge, The President of the United States of America takes pleasure in presenting the Navy and Marine Corps Medal to Chief Machinist's Mate William Badders, United States Navy in lieu of previously awarded letters of commendation: (A) Commendation by Secretary of the Navy dated August 6, 1926 (B) Commendation by Secretary of the Navy dated May 12, 1928 (C) Commendation by Commander in Chief Army & Navy dated September 16, 1939 (D) Commendation by ChBuNav dated December 27, 1940.

Badders also received the Good Conduct Medal, World War I Victory Medal, Yangtze Service Medal and American Defense Service Medal.

== See also ==
- List of Medal of Honor recipients
- List of Medal of Honor recipients in non-combat incidents
