= USS Gypsy (ARS(D)-1) =

1945 Gypsy-class salvage lifting vessel

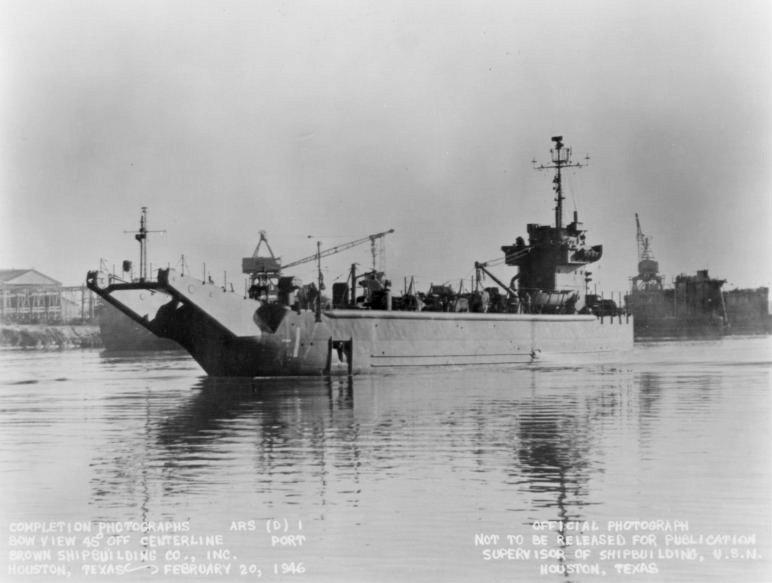
- Gypsy underway at Houston, Texas, 20 February 1946

History

United States
- Name: USS Gypsy
- Ordered: 1945, as LSM-549
- Builder: Brown Shipbuilding, Houston, Texas
- Laid down: 25 August 1945
- Launched: 7 December 1945
- Commissioned: 18 March 1946
- Decommissioned: 21 January 1948
- Renamed: USS Gypsy, 1 May 1945
- Reclassified: ARS(D)-1 (Salvage Lifting Vessel), 24 April 1945
- Recommissioned: 8 August 1951
- Decommissioned: 23 December 1955
- Stricken: 1 June 1973
- Fate: Sold for scrapping, 1 January 1974

General characteristics
- Class & type: Gypsy-class salvage lifting vessel
- Displacement: 816 long tons (829 t)
- Length: 224 ft 9 in (68.50 m)
- Beam: 34 ft 10 in (10.62 m)
- Draft: 8 ft 4 in (2.54 m)
- Propulsion: 2 × Fairbanks-Morse (model 38D81/8X10, reversible with hydraulic clutch) diesel engines, direct drive with 1,440 bhp (1,074 kW) each at 720 rpm, twin screws
- Speed: 13 knots (24 km/h; 15 mph)
- Range: 4,900 nmi (9,100 km) at 12 kn (22 km/h; 14 mph) (928 tons displacement)
- Complement: 65 officers and enlisted
- Armament: 2 × 20 mm AA guns

USS Gypsy (ARS(D)-1) was the lead ship of her class of salvage lifting vessels serving in the United States Navy. Originally designated LSM-549, she was launched by Brown Shipbuilding Corporation, Houston, Texas, on 7 December 1945, and commissioned on 18 March 1946 at Houston.

== Service history ==
=== 1946–1948 ===
Gypsy completed her shakedown training on 20 March 1946, and sailed 10 days later from Norfolk, VA for San Pedro, CA, where she arrived on 26 May. The ship then departed on 14 June to take part in the impending "Operation Crossroads", a historic series of atomic tests. Arriving off the atoll on 10 July 1946, Gypsy witnessed the "Baker" Test on 25 July and assisted in recovering beached and damaged craft and doing underwater work on test ships, as the US Navy developed a large amount of valuable scientific information on the effects of the atomic bomb on ships and how to reduce them.

Departing on 16 September 1946, Gypsy worked on the raising of SS Britain Victory at Honolulu, HI until 8 November. She arrived San Pedro on 10 December 1946 for extensive repairs until June 1947, then did limited salvage work before proceeding to Guam, arriving on 18 August 1947. There Gypsy salvaged and towed to Guam the former bow of cruiser Pittsburgh (CA-72), lost in the great typhoon of June 1945. She returned to San Diego on 17 January 1948, decommissioned on 21 January and joined Pacific Reserve Fleet, San Diego Group.

=== 1951–1955 ===
Gypsy was recommissioned on 8 August 1951, and after shakedown and repairs arrived Pearl Harbor on 19 October 1951. For the next seven months the ship operated in Apra Harbor, Guam, relocating mooring buoys and working on the breakwater. Arriving Pearl Harbor on 31 May 1952, Gypsy had new salvage equipment and electronic gear installed and sailed on 15 September for Subic Bay. Arriving on 9 October she began removing a sunken Japanese hulk. She sailed on 9 January 1953 for Inchon, South Korea, site of one of the decisive amphibious operations in history. There Gypsy removed a sunken barge from the harbor. Later she worked off Pohang and helped clear explosives from Ulsan harbor. Korean coastal work was completed on 6 May 1953, and the ship sailed for Pearl Harbor, via Yokosuka and Midway Island, arriving on 5 June. After operations there, Gypsy sailed to Eniwetok and upon her arrival on 18 September began renewing and positioning fleet moorings for the coming atomic bomb tests, "Operation Castle". She arrived Bikini Atoll on 7 February 1954 and witnessed the first test shot, the second thermonuclear explosion in history, on 1 March 1954. She assisted in recovering test equipment, was detached on 26 March 1954, returned to Pearl Harbor on 18 April. After operations there, she sailed to Long Beach, CA, arriving on 4 May 1955 for deactivation. Gypsy decommissioned on 23 December 1955 at Astoria, OR, and was placed in reserve.

In 1967 she was again relocated to the Pacific Reserve Fleet, San Diego Group. Gypsy was struck from the Naval Vessel Register on 1 June 1973 and sold for scrapping by the Defense Reutilization and Marketing Service (DRMS) on 1 January 1974.

== Awards ==
USS Gypsy received:
Three battle stars for Korean War service.
American Campaign Medal
World War II Victory Medal
National Defense Service Medal
Korean Service Medal (×3)
United Nations Service Medal
Republic of Korea War Service Medal (retroactive)
