= List of founder fellows of the Royal Society =

Original fellows of the Royal Society

This is a complete list of the founder fellows of the Royal Society. Founder fellows are defined as those present at the inaugural meeting of the Society at Gresham College on 28 November 1660.

== Fellows elected in 1660 ==
- William Ball (1627–1690)
- William Brouncker, 2nd Viscount Brouncker (1620–1684)
- Jonathan Goddard (1617–1675)
- Abraham Hill (1633–1721)
- Sir Robert Moray (1608–1673)
- Sir Paul Neile (1613–1686)
- Sir William Petty (1623–1687)
- Lawrence Rooke (1622–1662)

== Fellows elected in 1663 ==
- Robert Boyle (1627–1691)
- Alexander Bruce, 2nd Earl of Kincardine (1629–1681)
- John Wilkins (1614–1672)
- Sir Christopher Wren (1632–1723)

== See also ==
- Gresham College and the formation of the Royal Society
