= Hobbes–Wallis controversy =

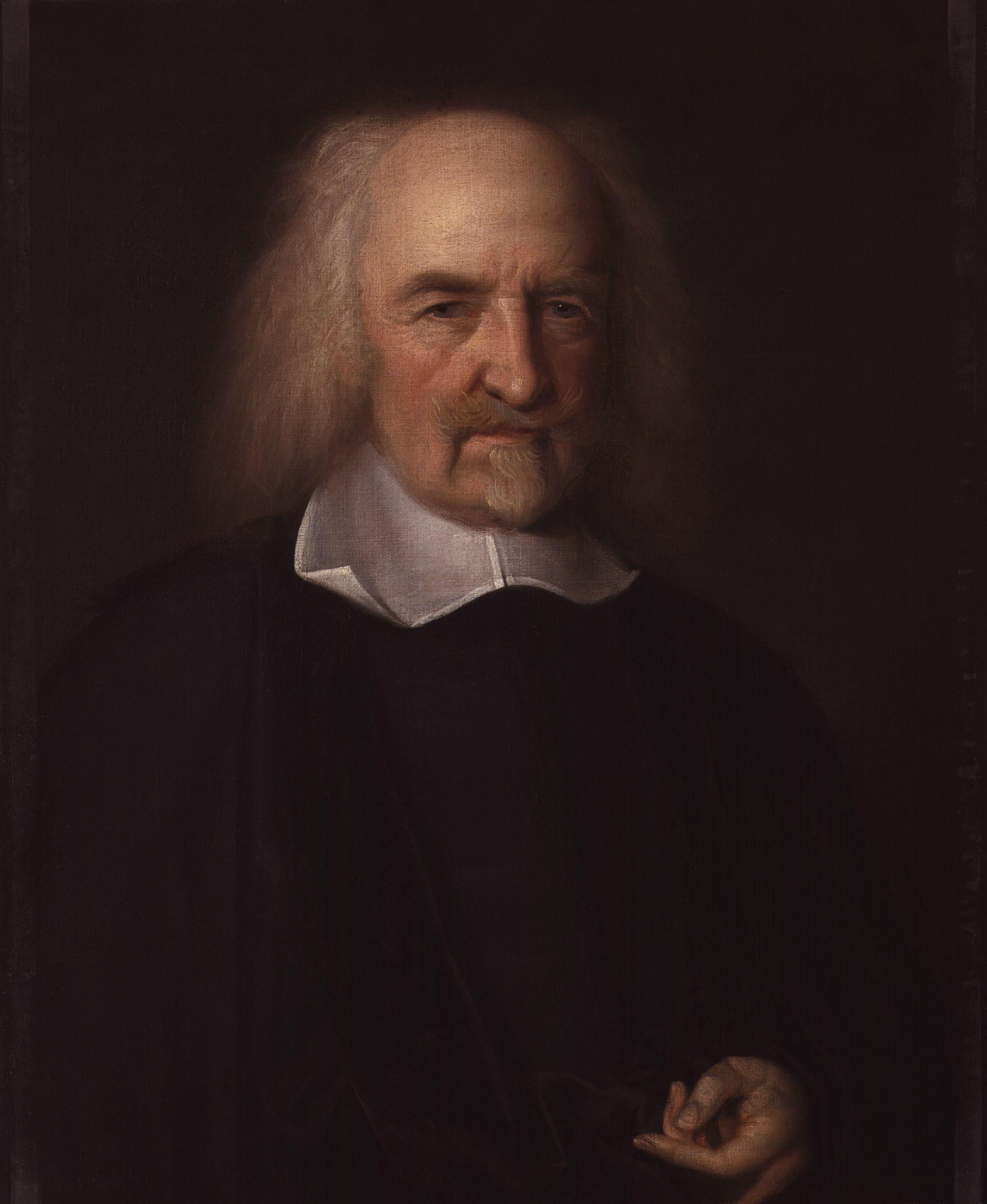
Thomas Hobbes (1588–1679)

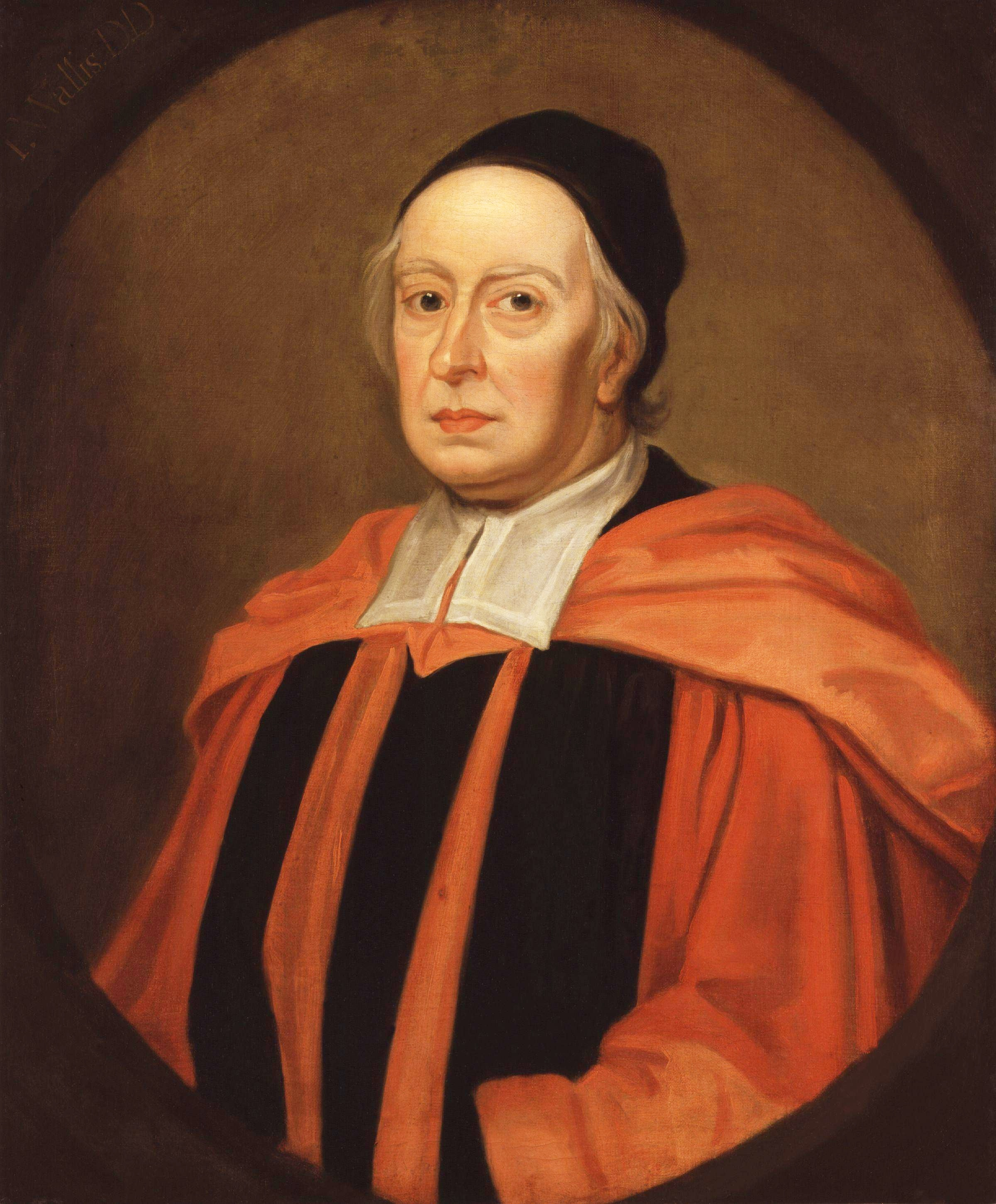
John Wallis (1616–1703)

The Hobbes–Wallis controversy was a polemic debate that continued from the mid-1650s well into the 1670s, between the philosopher Thomas Hobbes and the mathematician and clergyman John Wallis. It was sparked by De corpore, a philosophical work by Hobbes in the general area of physics. The book contained not only a theory of mathematics subordinating it to geometry and geometry to kinematics, but a claimed proof of the squaring of the circle by Hobbes. While Hobbes retracted this particular proof, he returned to the topic with other attempted proofs. A pamphleteering exchange continued for decades. It drew in the newly formed Royal Society, and its experimental philosophy to which Hobbes was (on principle) opposed.

The sustained nature of the exchanges can be attributed to several strands of the intellectual situation of the time. In mathematics there were open issues, namely the priority (pedagogic, or theoretical) to be assigned to geometry and algebra; and the status of algebra itself, which (from an English standpoint) had been pulled together by the text of William Oughtred, as more than a collection of symbolic abbreviations. Socially, the formation of the group of Royal Society members, and the status of the publication Philosophical Transactions, was brought to a point as the quarrel proceeded, with Hobbes playing the outsider versus the self-selecting guild.

Hobbes was an easy target, on the ground chosen by Wallis. The failure of his attempts to solve the impossible problems he set himself were inevitable, but he neither backed down completely, nor applied adequate self-criticism. And on the level of character, Wallis was as intransigent as Hobbes was dogmatic, and this inflicted damage on both of their reputations. Quentin Skinner writes: "There is no doubt that at the personal level Wallis behaved badly (as was widely conceded at the time)." The fact that Wallis was a Presbyterian, a university man, and an anti-Royalist during the civil war made him "three times an enemy to Hobbes", as Anthony Gottlieb points out in The Dream of Enlightenment.

Part of the significance of the controversy is that Hobbes felt that, in the later stages, the Royal Society was in some way complicit in the attacks from Wallis, despite the fact that he had many friends as Fellows in it. This attitude presented one of the obstacles to Hobbes himself becoming a member, though not the only one.

== Hobbes attacks the universities ==
Hobbes in Leviathan (1651) joined others in attacks on the existing Oxbridge academic system, essentially a monopoly in England of university teaching. These attacks, especially that of John Webster in Examen academiarum, drew stung replies from Oxford professors. Wallis joined in, but the first wave of rebuttals came from other major names.

The issue of the universities was heavily loaded at the time, and the orthodox Presbyterian minister Thomas Hall lined up with Vindiciae literarum (1654). He had been arguing since The Pulpit Guarded (1651) that university learning was the bastion of defence against proliferating unorthodoxy and heresy. Webster had put the other side of the argument, in The Saints Guide (1653), casting doubt on the need for a university-educated clergy.

In 1654 Seth Ward (1617–1689), the Savilian Professor of Astronomy, replied in Vindiciae academiarum to the assaults. It was an anonymous publication of Ward and John Wilkins, but not intended to conceal its authorship (JohN WilkinS signed N.S. and SetH WarD signed H.D.). The agenda and tone for the controversy was first set by Ward when he launched a general attack on Hobbes. Wilkins wrote a preface to Vindiciae academiarum; the main text by Ward mentioned Hobbes, who was the particular target of an appendix. Ward claimed in both places that Hobbes had plagiarised Walter Warner. Before Leviathan, Wilkins certainly was not hostile to Hobbes, and in fact wrote a Latin poem for the 1650 Humane Nature; or the Fundamental Elements of Policy, an edition of part of the Elements of Law of Hobbes; and the preface to that book has been attributed to Ward. But the emergence of the full scope of the philosophy of Hobbes in Leviathan lost him allies who may have shared somewhat in his starting assumptions, but who felt a need to distance themselves from his conclusions, as Ward did in his Philosophicall Essay of 1652. Ward went on to make a full-dress attack on Hobbes the philosopher, the In Thomae Hobbii philosophiam exercitatio epistolica of 1656, dedicated to Wilkins.

== Early controversy on mathematics ==
Errors in De Corpore, in the mathematical sections, opened Hobbes to criticism also from John Wallis, Savilian Professor of Geometry.

=== The Elenchus ===
Wallis's Elenchus geometriae Hobbianae, published in 1655, contained an elaborate criticism of Hobbes's attempt to put the foundations of mathematical science in its place within knowledge. Hobbes had limited his interest to geometry, restricting the scope of mathematics.

The book was dedicated to John Owen, and in prefatory remarks Wallis (a Presbyterian) avows that his differences with Hobbes are largely rooted in theology. Hobbes himself wrote to Samuel de Sorbière in the same year, saying the controversy was not merely scientific. He regarded the use of infinite quantities as the thin end of the wedge for a return of scholasticism, and behind Wallis he saw "all the Ecclesiastics of England". Sorbière visited Wallis in Oxford; but his analysis of Wallis as stereotypical pedant helped not at all in the quarrel.

Hobbes took care to remove some mistakes exposed by Wallis, before allowing an English translation of the De Corpore to appear in 1656. But he still attacked Wallis in a series of Six Lessons to the Professors of Mathematics, included with the De Corpore translation. Wallis defended himself, and re-confronted Hobbes with his mathematical inconsistencies. Hobbes responded with Marks of the Absurd Geometry, Rural Language, Scottish Church Politics, and Barbarisms of John Wallis, Professor of Geometry and Doctor of Divinity. It has been suggested that Hobbes was still trying to cultivate John Owen at this point: Owen was both the leading Independent theologian and Cromwell's choice as Vice-Chancellor of Oxford, and Hobbes softened his critical line on the universities while stoking up the quarrel with Wallis. Further, the religious dimension (Scottish Church Politics refers to the Presbyterianism of Wallis, not shared by Owen) has been seen as a presage of later analysis of Behemoth, the book Hobbes wrote in 1668 as a post-mortem on the English Revolution. The various thrusts were parried by Wallis in a reply (Hobbiani puncti dispunctio, 1657).

=== Controversy over foundational matters ===
Wallis published a comprehensive treatise on the general principles of calculus (Mathesis universalis, 1657). Here he strongly advocated giving priority to the approach through arithmetic and algebra. This was quite contrary to the arguments of both Hobbes and Isaac Barrow. Hobbes set store on the "demonstrable" status of geometry, in the Six Lessons. Jon Parkin writes:

For Hobbes, his new form of geometrical demonstration was the finest example of what a nominalist science could achieve. It offered demonstrably certain knowledge. The creation and interaction of lines could clearly be conceived as a product of matter in motion, whose properties could be demonstrated with the highest level of certainty.[...] Wallis, by contrast was the foremost exponent of Cartesian analytical geometry.

Mathematicians sympathetic to Hobbes included François du Verdus and François Pelau, and some of his works were later translated into English for pedagogic use by Venterus Mandey; but he was not backed up by a "school". On the other side as critics were Claude Mylon, Laurence Rooke, Viscount Brouncker, John Pell, Christiaan Huyghens; much of the criticism Hobbes received was by private correspondence, or in the case of Pell direct contact. Henry Stubbe, later a vehement critic of the Royal Society, assured Hobbes in 1657 he had some (unnamed) supporters in Oxford.

Hobbes decided again to attack the new methods of mathematical analysis and by the spring of 1660, he had put his criticism and assertions into five dialogues under the title Examinatio et emendatio mathematicae hodiernae qualis explicatur in libris Johannis Wallisii, with a sixth dialogue so called, consisting almost entirely of seventy or more propositions on the circle and cycloid. Wallis, however, would not take the bait.

=== Hobbes and duplicating the cube ===
Hobbes then tried another tack, having solved, as he thought, another ancient problem, the duplication of the cube. He had his solution brought out anonymously in French, so as to put his critics off the scent. He slipped in algebraic terms in early efforts, by cubing √2 to the answer 2. While Hobbes would withdraw some arguments as erroneous, he distinguished between "errors of negligence" and "errors of principle", and found the latter much harder to admit. He was led to argue that the doctrine of nth roots in algebra (one contribution of Wallis) did not adequately model the geometric notions based on area and volume. René François Walter de Sluse walked through Hobbes's proof in one version, clearing the radicals to come down to a numerical assertion it implied (97,336 = 97,556), which could only be accepted as an approximation. Hobbes replied with an idiosyncratic appeal to a form of dimensional analysis, where algebraic quantities are non-dimensional. In general, his positions hardened after 1660.

Wallis publicly refuted the solution, but Hobbes claimed the credit of it. He republished it (in modified form), with his remarks, at the end of the 1661 Dialogus Physicus.

== Second phase: the Dialogus physicus of 1661 ==
The Dialogus physicus, sive De natura aeris attacked Robert Boyle and other friends of Wallis who were forming themselves into a society (incorporated as the Royal Society in 1662) for experimental research. The full Latin title of the book mentioned Gresham College as the experimental base of Boyle's group (see Gresham College and the formation of the Royal Society), followed immediately by a reference to the duplication of the cube, which in Hobbes's latest version was included as an appendix. Hobbes chose to take as the manifesto of the new academy Boyle's New Experiments touching the Spring of the Air (1660). Hobbes saw the whole approach as a direct contravention of the method of physical inquiry enjoined in the De Corpore. He had reasoned out his own conclusions years before from speculative principles, and he warned them that if they were not content to begin where he had left off, their work would come to naught. This attack from Hobbes was one of several at the time: other opponents of Boyle were Franciscus Linus and Henry More. The issues at stake now had broadened out, and this was a choice Hobbes made, with their implications reaching beyond those of the first phase.

To Hobbes, Boyle replied himself, in the Examen of Mr T. Hobbes, which appeared as an appendix to a second edition (1662) of the New Experiments, along with an answer to Linus. But first Wallis was drawn in again, with the satire Hobbius heauton-timorumenos (1662). It included the accusation that Hobbes used purely verbal tactics, preferring his own semantics of a term such as "air", to cast doubt on the existence of a vacuum.

Hobbes reacted to personal attack by keeping aloof from scientific controversy for some years. He did write a letter about himself in the third person, Considerations upon the Reputation, Loyalty, Manners and Religion of Thomas Hobbes's. In this biographical piece, he told his own and Wallis's "little stories during the time of the late rebellion". Wallis did not attempt a reply.

== Hobbes and the Royal Society ==
Hobbes never became a Fellow of the Royal Society, which was formally founded right at the time when the controversy drew in Boyle, and it has been debated why. Possible explanations are that he was difficult (cantankerous, even), and in other ways incompatible with the Society as club; or that the attacks by Wallis had successfully diminished his reputation, by showing that he was a lightweight in mathematics, part of a bigger polemic plan to show his thought generally as unoriginal, coming secondhand from others. Another simple explanation is that Hobbes was too "controversial" in the modern sense: he was excluded for reasons of image management.

It is possible that Hobbes's objections to academia extended to the Society. John Aubrey reports that Hobbes thought he had a small group of enemies there. Wallis, Ward and Wilkins were indeed key members of the early Royal Society, having been in the precursor group ("Oxford Philosophical Club") in Oxford.

Quentin Skinner therefore proposed, in a 1969 paper Hobbes and the politics of the early Royal Society, that small-group politics explained enough: those three kept Hobbes out of the Royal Society at the start; and that his continuing absence is sufficiently explained by Hobbes's resentment at such treatment. Certainly Hobbes took it badly that Wallis could use the Philosophical Transactions to publish his critical views, for example in a review of Hobbes's Rosetum geometricum, and complained about this in 1672 to Henry Oldenburg.

Recent scholarly explanations are more complex. It is argued by Noel Malcolm that the general position of Hobbes, in 'mechanistic philosophy', was close enough to that current in the Royal Society to be compatible (even given the debate with Boyle), but that his reputation from the political and religious side made him untouchable, and the Society kept him at arm's length for that reason.

== Later publications ==
After a time Hobbes began a further period of controversial activity, which he dragged out until his ninetieth year. The first piece, published in 1666, De principiis et ratiocinatione geometrarum, was an attack on geometry professors. Three years later he brought his three mathematical achievements together in Quadratura circuli, Cubatio sphaerae, Duplicitio cubii, and as soon as they were once more refuted by Wallis, reprinted them with an answer to the objections. Wallis, who had promised to leave him alone, refuted him again before the year was out. The exchange dragged on through numerous other papers until 1678.

== Timeline ==
- 1650 Hobbes, Humane Nature; or the Fundamental Elements of Policy
- 1651 Hobbes, Leviathan
- 1652 Ward, A Philosophicall Essay towards an Eviction of the Being and Attributes of God
- 1654 Webster, Academiarum examen
- 1654 Ward and Wilkins, Vindiciae academiarum
- 1655 Hobbes, De Corpore
- 1655 Wallis, Elenchus geometriae Hobbianae
- 1656 Hobbes, Six Lessons to the Professors of the Mathematics
- 1656 Hobbes, De Corpore, English edition
- 1656 Wallis, Due correction for Mr Hobbes
- 1656 Ward, In Thomae Hobbii philosophiam exercitatio epistolica
- 1657 Hobbes, Marks of the Absurd Geometry, Rural Language, Scottish Church Politics, and Barbarisms of John Wallis
- 1657 Wallis, Hobbiani puncti dispunctio
- 1657 Wallis, Mathesis universalis
- 1660 Hobbes, Examinatio et emendatio mathematicae hodiernae qualis explicatur in libris Johannis Wallisii
- 1660 Boyle, New Experiments touching the Spring of the Air
- 1661 Hobbes, Dialogus physicus, sive De natura aeris
- 1662 Wallis, Hobbius heauton-timorumenos
- 1662 Boyle, An examen of Mr. T. Hobbes his Dialogus Physicus de Natura Aeris
- 1662 Hobbes, Considerations upon the Reputation, Loyalty, Manners and Religion of Thomas Hobbes's
- 1674 Boyle, Animadversions upon Mr. Hobbes's Problemata de Vacuo
