= List of fellows of the Royal Society elected in 1660 =

This is a complete list of fellows of the Royal Society elected in its first year, 1660.

== Founder fellows ==
- William Ball (1627–1690)
- William Brouncker, 2nd Viscount Brouncker (1620–1684)
- Jonathan Goddard (1617–1675)
- Abraham Hill (1633–1721)
- Sir Robert Moray (1608–1673)
- Sir Paul Neile (1613–1686)
- Sir William Petty (1623–1687)
- Lawrence Rooke (1622–1662)

== Original fellows ==
- John Austin (1613–1669)
- George Bate (1608–1668)
- Giles Rawlins (d. 1662)
