= Oxford Philosophical Club =

Associates of John Wilkins, 1649 to 1660

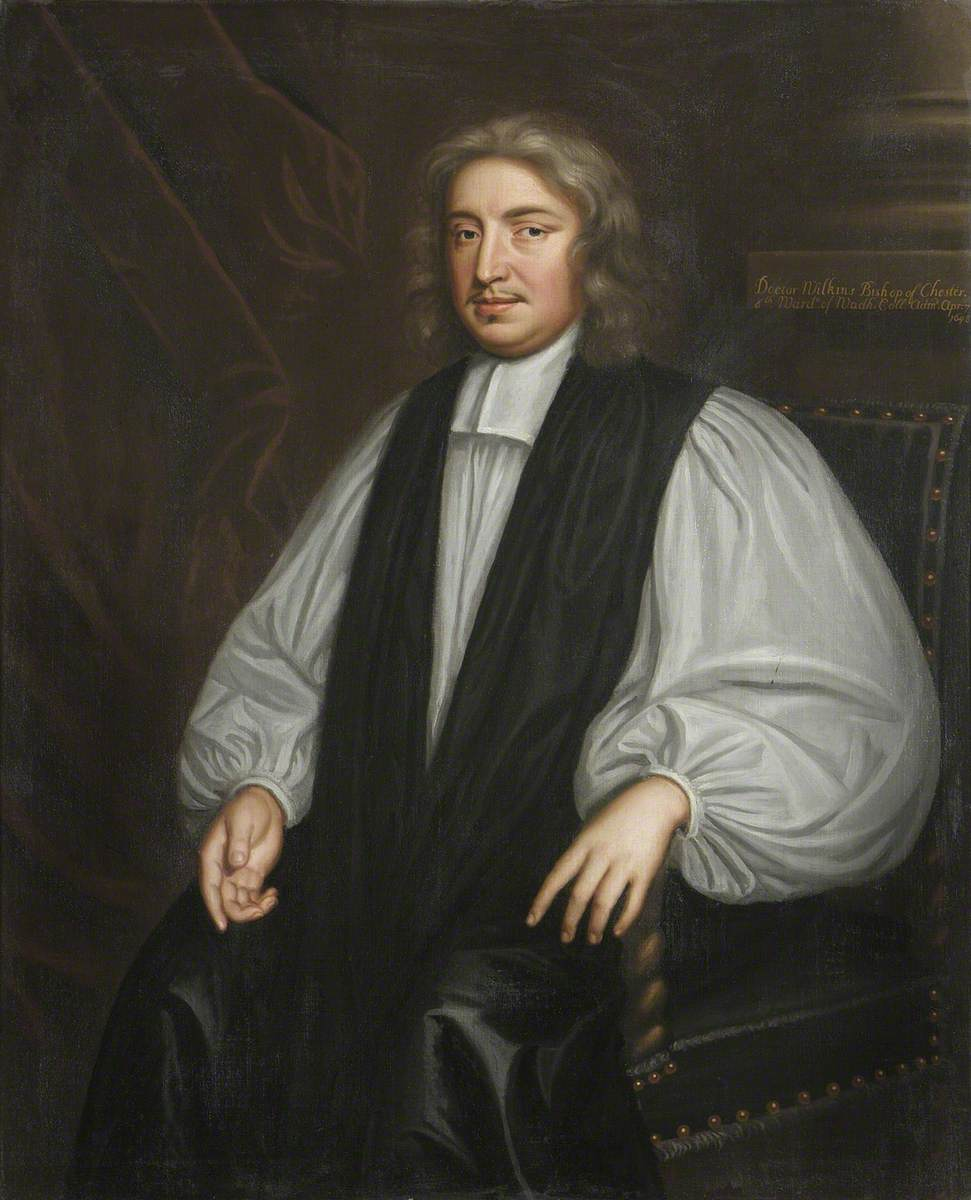
John Wilkins of Wadham College, Oxford, founder of the Oxford Philosophical Club

The Oxford Philosophical Club, also referred to as the "Oxford Circle", was to a group of natural philosophers, mathematicians, physicians, virtuosi and dilettanti gathering around John Wilkins FRS (1614–1672) at Oxford in the period 1649 to 1660. It is documented in particular by John Aubrey: he refers to it as an "experimental philosophical club" run weekly by Wilkins, who successfully bridged the political divide of the times. There is surviving evidence that the Club was formally constituted, and undertook some projects in Oxford libraries.

Its historical importance is that members of the Oxford Circle and the Greshamites joined together to form the Royal Society of London in the early 1660s under Charles II. Having been newly restored as King, Charles II favoured these great scientists and philosophers, so much so that he considered himself one of them.

Wilkins was Warden of Wadham College, and the circle around him is also known as the Wadham Group, though it was not restricted to members of the College. It included William Petty, Jonathan Goddard and John Wallis from the 1645 group in London.

The term Oxford Philosophical Society may refer to this club, or at least two later societies.

== Views ==
A number of the Club's leading members showed a united front in opposition to Thomas Hobbes, from 1654, as they resisted external pressures for university reform. In the longer term the Hobbes-Wallis controversy developed out of the Vindiciae academiarum (1654) of Wilkins and Seth Ward. Generally Wilkins with Goddard and a few other allies were active on the traditionalist side of the debates on academia of the time, a point emphasised later by Thomas Sprat and Walter Pope, as well as trying to keep a calm approach on divisive issues. Wilkins and Ward sympathised with Puritan views, as followers of the line of John Conant, but not with the wish for open theological clashes. One of the aims of the group was in theology, however: to develop a natural philosophy which would be at the same time "mechanical" and providential.

== Participation ==
Those attracted to Oxford directly by the presence of Wilkins include Ward, William Neile, Laurence Rooke, and Christopher Wren. Others who became involved were Ralph Bathurst, Thomas Willis, and Matthew Wren. Robert Boyle moved to Oxford in 1655/6 and joined the group; when Wilkins moved to Cambridge in 1659 Boyle accommodated the continuing meetings. Around 1652 Wilkins was very active on behalf of the club and Wadham as a scientific centre, bringing in technical expertise including that of Ralph Greatorex, and finding ways to finance equipment. Eventually Wadham had a laboratory area. Wilkins continued to assemble his group, and it came to include also Richard Lower, his relation Walter Pope, William Holder, and Nathaniel Hodges. Robert Hooke became involved, through his work for Willis and then Boyle. It has been suggested that Daniel Coxe was also linked to the club in the later 1650s.

The Oxford circle drew a constitution which called for each member to contribute with a lecture or a demonstration. The constitution consisted of eight rules to frame the meetings of which minutes were recorded up until at least 1690.
