= Gresham College and the formation of the Royal Society =

Precursor to the Royal Society of London

The Gresham College group was a loose collection of scientists in England of the 1640s and 1650s, a precursor to the Royal Society of London. Within a few years of the granting of a charter to the Royal Society in 1662, its earlier history was being written and its roots contested. There is still some debate about the effect of other groups on the way the Royal Society came into being. The composition of those other groups is unclear in parts; and the overall historiography of the early Royal Society is still often regarded as problematic. But this group has always been seen as fundamental to the course of events.

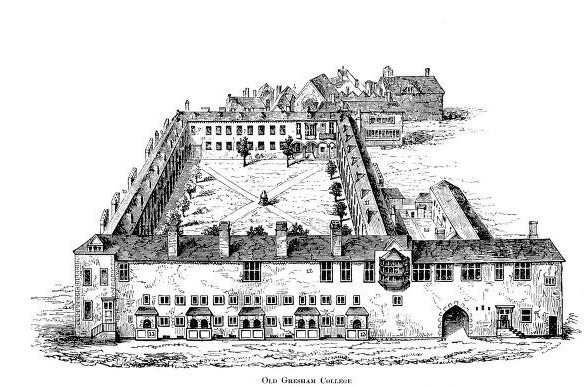
View of Gresham College in its original location.

Both the location and the staff of London's Gresham College, a foundation outside the old universities at which lectures were given for the general public, played significant roles in the events leading up to the charter given to the Royal Society. More accurately, there were at least four identifiable successive groups of virtuosi (as they would have been called at the time), natural philosophers and physicians, in London and Oxford, in the period from the outbreak of the First English Civil War to the English Restoration of 1660. Of those, two were based at Gresham College: the so-called 1645 group concerned with experimental science; and the 1660 committee of 12 who steered the early days in which the Royal Society was formed, i.e. in the period October 1660 to 1662. According to a history of the College:

the scientific network which centred on Gresham College played a crucial part in the meetings which led to the formation of the Royal Society.

The traditional account, represented by the Royal Society's handbook from a century ago, which took at face value some of Thomas Sprat and John Wallis's statements about the pre-history, is more cut-and-dried than current views about the central role of the "Gresham College group". Sprat's History of the Royal Society (1667) is now generally considered a work of apologetics rather than reliable history; and Wallis was writing much later, with his own agenda. But with some nuances, the outline of the events connected with Gresham College remains much the same.

== Gresham College group of 1645 ==
Meetings at Jonathan Goddard's lodgings which were in Wood Street, or Cheapside, may have preceded the 1645 Gresham College gatherings, or may have been concurrent; an account of John Wallis asserts there was a group convened by Theodore Haak. This group is now often called simply the “1645 group”. George Ent, Francis Glisson and Charles Scarborough joined around 1647. Wallis mentions also John Wilkins, Samuel Foster and Christopher Merret. The group broke up around 1648.

There are in fact two accounts by Wallis, the first from 1678, and the second (unpublished at the time) from 1697. The first version (A Defence of the Royal Society) was produced to contradict William Holder, with whom Wallis was in dispute over his work in speech therapy. The second version was published in 1725 by Thomas Hearne, in front matter to his edition of the chronicle of Peter Langtoft; from where in 1756 Thomas Birch picked it up as an authority on the origins of the Royal Society, and argued against Sprat's history as superficial on its formation.

Some doubts have been cast on Wallis's accounts as authoritative. Haak was an associate of Wallis through the religious activities of the Westminster Assembly; it has been questioned whether his role was a central as Wallis suggested. On the other hand Haak had other associations (with Marin Mersenne; with John Pell and Gabriel Plattes of the Hartlib Circle). Margery Purver has argued that Sprat's History is more reliable for the purposes of the Royal Society, their reading of Francis Bacon's thought, and the intention to develop science according to a taxonomic approach.

== Relationship with other groups ==
While the traditional account, from Thomas Birch in the eighteenth century, identified the 1645 Gresham group with the "invisible college" mentioned in correspondence of the young Robert Boyle from 1646 and 1647, this is now generally doubted. Other candidates for the Invisible College mentioned in Boyle's letters are regarded as more plausible: the "Comenian" part of the larger Hartlib Circle, and the group that probably substantially overlapped it gathered by Lady Ranelagh, Boyle's sister. Margery Purver identifies it in more specific terms among Hartlib's associates, those supporting the institution of an "Office of Address". Apart from Boyle himself, the only figure identifiable with the "invisible college" (under this description) to have played a leading part later in the Royal Society is William Petty. On the other hand during the 1650s Henry Oldenburg came to know Boyle and others, both in the Oxford and the Hartlib group, through similar contacts.

Both John Wilkins and John Wallis moved to Oxford in 1648, shortly after the end of the First English Civil War. Wilkins then put together a loose grouping now sometimes known as the Oxford Experimental Philosophy Club. It brought together natural philosophers without regard to political distinctions, and recruited a number of key figures for the future Royal Society. There was some migration back to London and Gresham, as vacancies occurred.

== Gresham professors 1650–1660 ==
There were seven professorial chairs at Gresham, in Astronomy, Divinity, Geometry (Mathematics), Law, Music, Physic (Medicine), and Rhetoric. As listed on the Gresham College website, their holders were as follows:

Year	Astronomy	Divinity	Geometry	Law	Music	Physic	Rhetoric
1650	Samuel Foster	Thomas Horton	Daniel Whistler	John Bond	William Petty	Thomas Winston	John Goodridge
1651	Foster	Horton	Whistler	Bond	Petty	Winston	Goodridge
1652	Lawrence Rooke	Horton	Whistler	Bond	Petty	Winston	Goodridge
1653	Rooke	Horton	Whistler	Bond	Petty	Winston	Goodridge
1654	Rooke	Horton	Whistler	Bond	Petty	Winston	Richard Hunt
1655	Rooke	Horton	Whistler	Bond	Petty	Jonathan Goddard	Hunt
1656	Rooke	Horton	Whistler	Bond	Petty	Goddard	Hunt
1657	Christopher Wren	Horton	Rooke	Bond	Petty	Goddard	Hunt
1658	Wren	Horton	Rooke	Bond	Petty	Goddard	Hunt
1659	Wren	Horton	Rooke	Bond	Petty	Goddard	William Croone
1660	Walter Pope	Horton	Rooke	Bond	Thomas Baines	Goddard	Croone

When in 1659 William Croone took over the chair of rhetoric, he therefore joined Wren (astronomy), Rooke (mathematics), Petty (music), and Goddard (physic), making five of the seven professors men who would be significant figures in the future Royal Society.

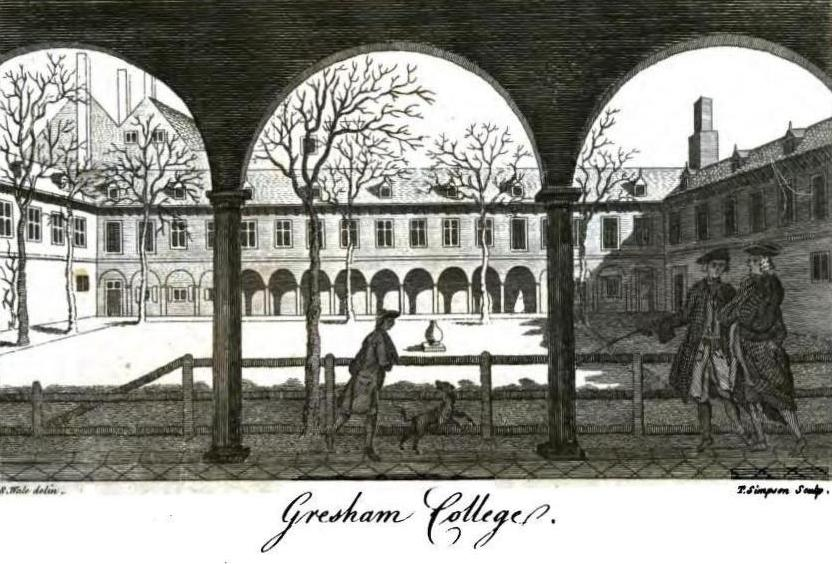
Gresham College, the court with figures in eighteenth-century dress.

A traditional account speaks of an "Oxonian Society" then meeting at Gresham College (from the Percy Anecdotes):

The greatest part of these Oxford gentlemen coming to London in 1659, held their meeting twice a week at Gresham College. Here they were joined by several new associates [...] These meetings were continued till the members were scattered by the disasters of 1659, after the resignation of Richard Cromwell, when their place of meeting was converted into quarters for soldiers. But, after the

restoration of King Charles II in 1660, these meetings were revived, and still more numerously attended.

The point is still debated, however, whether the disruptive billeting of soldiers at the college took place in 1658 or 1659. Maddison says 1659.

== Gresham College group of 1660 ==
On 28 November 1660 there was a committee meeting in the rooms at Gresham College, London, of Lawrence Rooke, after a lecture at the college by Christopher Wren. Minutes were taken, documenting a proposal for a new "college". This committee is generally regarded as the significant force behind the founding of the Royal Society, the vehicle by which a group of "virtuosi" transformed itself into a learned society.

Its composition was as follows.

Member	Background	Future role
William Ball	Royalist lawyer. Astronomer. Ball joined the meetings of the "Oxonian Society" at Gresham College in 1659. His interest was in particular the planet Saturn, in the period 1656–9.	
Robert Boyle	Parliamentarian, Anglo-Irish religious writer and experimentalist settled in the West Country, in contact with the Hartlib Circle in the 1640s and the Oxford group in the 1650s.	
William Brouncker	Royalist mathematician. Irish peer.	PRS.
Alexander Bruce	Scottish inventor.	
Jonathan Goddard	Parliamentarian physician.	
Abraham Hill	Wealthy London merchant with chambers in Gresham College from 1659.	
Sir Robert Moray	Scottish royalist exile.	
Paul Neile	Royalist astronomer.	
William Petty	Parliamentarian statistician and economist.	
Lawrence Rooke	Parliamentarian mathematician.	
John Wilkins	Parliamentarian natural philosopher.	
Christopher Wren	Royalist experimentalist and architect.	

Brouncker, Moray, Bruce and Neile represented the royal court. William Croone was absent, but was nominated for a committee position. The formation of a society proceeded by the compilation of a list of 40 who should be sought as paying members, and then a phase of recruitment.

From this time the group known as the "Philosophical Society" was constituted. It took on other members through 1661, for example William Erskine.

The Royal Society received its name and privileges in three royal charters, of 1662, 1663 and 1669. The "original fellows" or founding Fellows of the Royal Society are taken to be those who were members by June 1663.

== The Royal Society at Gresham College ==
The Royal Society once constituted met at Gresham College, until the 1666 Great Fire of London. Then as a consequence they moved to Arundel House. A grant had been made to the Society of the premises of the old Chelsea College, but no settled plan was made to use them; and they were eventually sold in the 1670s.

== See also ==
- Royal Society
