= Craigie (hamlet), Perth and Kinross =

Coordinates: 56.575102°N 3.438833°W

Craigie: Scottish Gaelic: Creagaidh
- Location within Perth and Kinross
- OS grid reference: NO117435
- Council area: Perth and Kinross
- Lieutenancy area: Perth and Kinross
- Country: Scotland
- Sovereign state: United Kingdom
- Post town: BLAIRGOWRIE
- Postcode district: PH10
- Dialling code: 01250
- Police: Scotland
- Fire: Scottish
- Ambulance: Scottish
- UK Parliament: Angus and Perthshire Glens
- Scottish Parliament: Perth Mid Scotland and Fife

Craigie is a village 6 kilometres (3.7 miles) west of Blairgowrie, in Perth and Kinross, Scotland. It is situated on the eastern side of Loch Clunie.

Robert Moray, the first President of the Royal Society, was the elder of two sons of Sir Mungo Moray of Craigie.

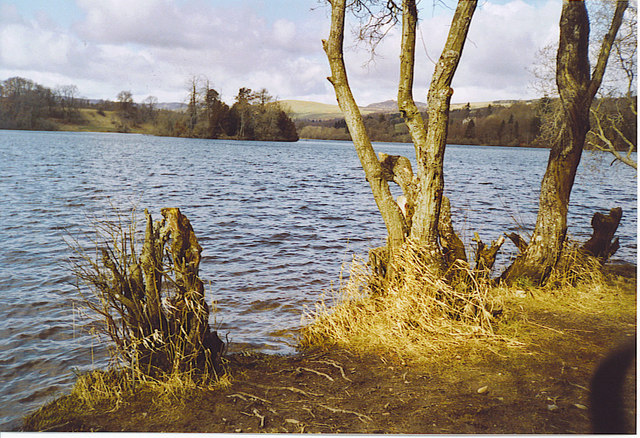
Loch Clunie, photograph taken from Craigie
