= Wadham College, Oxford =

College of the University of Oxford

Wadham College
- University of Oxford
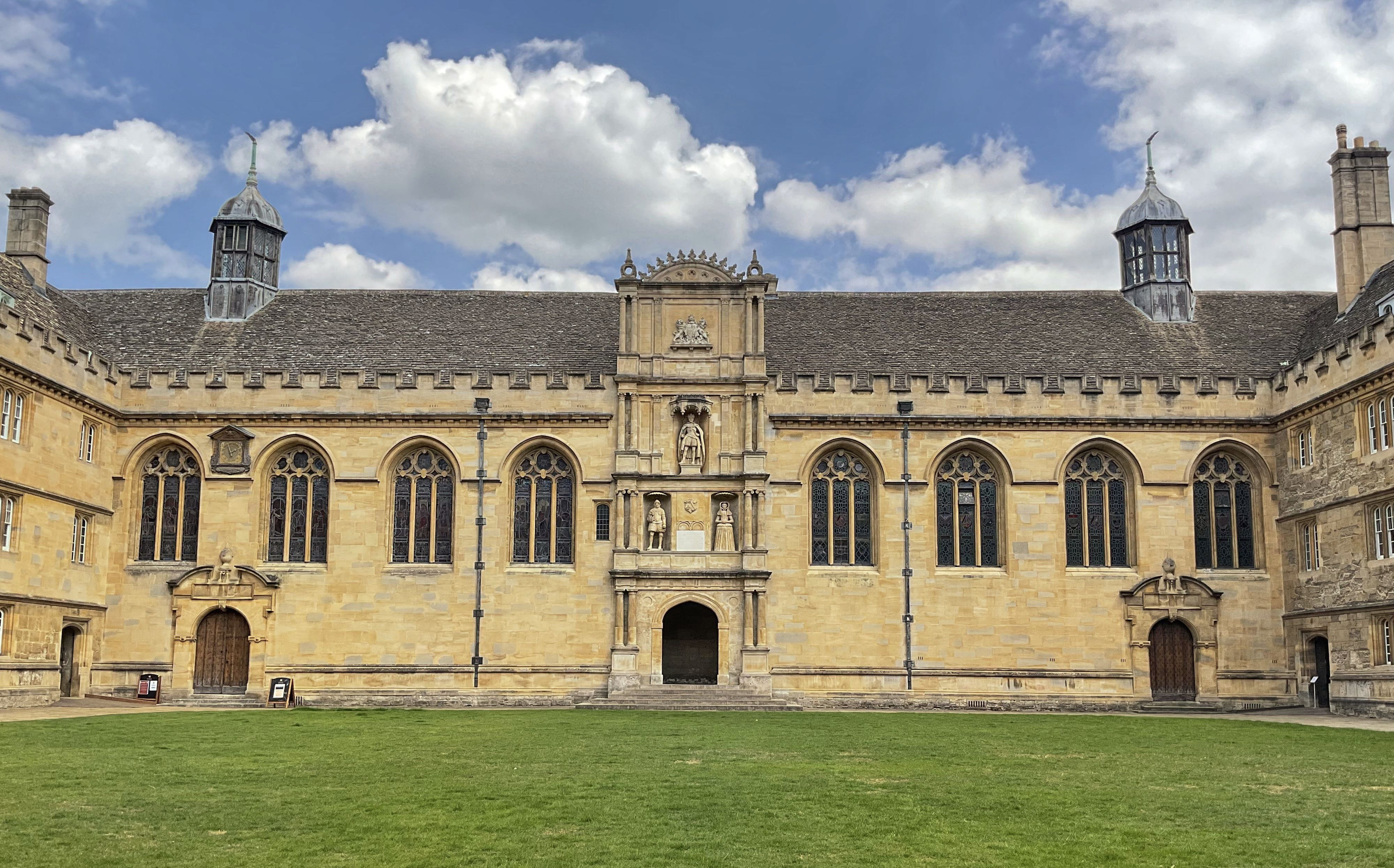

- Arms: Gules, a chevron between 3 roses argent barbed vert (Wadham); impaling Gules, a bend or between 2 escallops argent (Petre)
Scarf colours: black, with two grey-blue stripes a quarter of a scarf-width in from either edge, each stripe edged with a yellow pinstripe on the right-hand side only
- Location: Parks Road
- Coordinates: 51.755871°N 1.254593°W
- Full name: Warden, Fellows and Scholars of Wadham College of the Foundation of Nicholas Wadham Esquire and Dorothy His Wife in the University of Oxford
- Latin name: Collegium Wadhami
- Established: 1610; 416 years ago
- Named for: Dorothy (née Petre) and Nicholas Wadham
- Sister college: Christ's College, Cambridge
- Warden: Robert Hannigan
- Undergraduates: 471 (2022)
- Postgraduates: 217 (2022)
- Endowment: £145 million (2025)
- Website: wadham.ox.ac.uk
- Boat club: Wadham College Boat Club

Map
- Location within Oxford city centre

Wadham College (/ˈwɒdəm/ WOD-əm) is a constituent college of the University of Oxford in the United Kingdom. It is located in the centre of Oxford, at the intersection of Broad Street and Parks Road. Wadham College was founded in 1610 by Dorothy Wadham, according to the will of her late husband Nicholas Wadham, a member of an ancient Devon and Somerset family.

The central buildings, a notable example of Jacobean architecture, were designed by the architect William Arnold and erected between 1610 and 1613. They include a large and ornate Hall. Adjacent to the central buildings are the Wadham Gardens. Wadham is one of the largest colleges of the University of Oxford, with about 480 undergraduates and 240 graduate students. The college publishes an annual magazine for alumni, the Wadham College Gazette. As of 2025, it had an estimated financial endowment of £145 million, and in the 2021–2022 academic year ranked seventh in the Norrington Table, a measure which ranks Oxford colleges by academic performance.

Amongst Wadham's most famous alumni is Sir Christopher Wren. Wren was one of a group of experimental scientists at Oxford in the 1650s, the Oxford Philosophical Club, which included Robert Boyle and Robert Hooke. This group held regular meetings at Wadham College under the guidance of the warden, John Wilkins, and the group formed the nucleus which went on to found the Royal Society.

== History ==
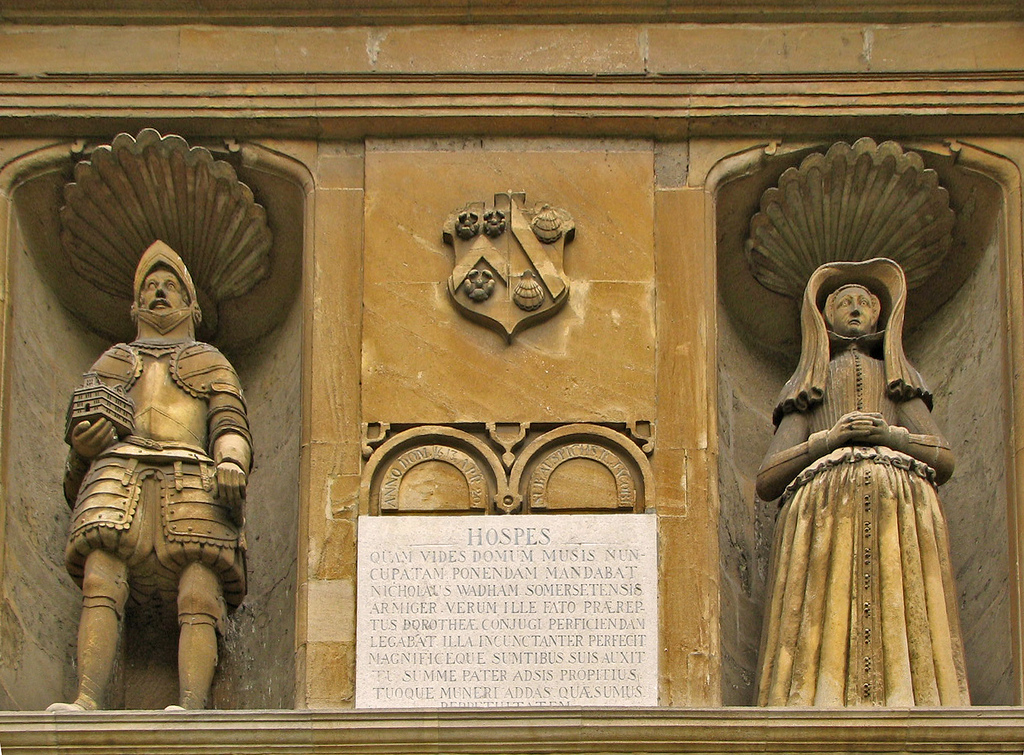
Statues of the founders above the main entrance to the Hall

=== 17th century ===
The college was founded by Dorothy Wadham (née Petre) in 1610, according to the wishes set out in the will of her husband Nicholas Wadham. Over four years, she gained royal and ecclesiastical support for the new college, negotiated the purchase of a site, appointed the West Country architect William Arnold, drew up the college statutes, and appointed the first warden, fellows, scholars, and cook. Although she never visited Oxford, she kept tight control of her new college and its finances until her death in 1618.

The wardenship of John Wilkins (1648–1659) is a significant period in the history of the college. Wilkins was a member of a group which had met for some years in London to discuss problems in the natural sciences. Many of the group moved to Oxford and held regular meetings in the Warden's lodgings at Wadham. Among them were Robert Boyle, Robert Hooke, John Locke, William Petty, John Wallis, and Thomas Willis. Wadham provided the largest contingent, some twelve of the fifty names mentioned. These included Christopher Brookes (mathematician and instrument-maker), John Mayow (a distinguished chemist and physician), Lawrence Rooke (later astronomy professor at Gresham College, London), Thomas Sprat (later the official historian of the Royal Society), Seth Ward (mathematician and Savilian Professor of Astronomy), and Sir Christopher Wren (mathematician and Savilian Professor of Astronomy).

Sir Christopher Wren was an undergraduate at Wadham before he became a fellow of All Souls and then succeeded Rooke as astronomy professor at Gresham College, London. He eventually returned to occupy rooms at Wadham while he was the Savilian Professor of Astronomy from 1661. Wren had notable achievements in pure and applied mathematics, astronomy, physics and biology to his credit before he turned to architecture, in his thirties. In mathematical ability alone, Wren was ranked by competent authorities second only to Newton among the men of his time.

The Warden's lodgings were stuffed with ingenious instruments, and powerful telescopes were mounted on the college tower. The Oxford group kept up close relations with their colleagues in London, and in 1660, at Gresham, the decision was taken to create the body which, in 1662, was to be formally incorporated as the Royal Society. Wilkins was the first president of the provisional body, and became the first secretary of the Royal Society itself. These were the beginnings of organised scientific research in Britain.

=== The Bowra era ===
Maurice Bowra was Warden of the college from 1938 until 1970, and was influential in determining the character of the college as open and meritocratic. He was known for his hospitality but also for his waspish wit, and anecdotes about his time as Warden remain in circulation amongst Wadham alumni. A statue of Bowra is in the college gardens, and the college's 1992 Bowra Building bears his name.

=== Modern day ===
The college now consists of some 70 Fellows, about 230 graduate students, and about 450 undergraduates. The current Warden is Robert Hannigan. Hannigan succeeded Lord Macdonald of River Glaven QC as Warden upon Macdonald's retirement in 2021.

==== Promotion of equality, diversity and rights ====
In 1974, after more than three-and-a-half centuries as a men-only institution, Wadham was among the first group of five all-male colleges at Oxford to admit women as full members, the others being Brasenose, Jesus College, Hertford and St Catherine's.

Wadham College has a reputation as a supporter of gay rights partly because it plays host to "Queerfest", a celebration of the LGBTQ cause. In 2011, Wadham became the first Oxbridge college to fly the Rainbow Flag in support of equality, as part of its annual Queer Week. The rainbow flag also flies over Wadham each year during February, to mark LGBT history month.

A Wadham student tradition is that student social events are always concluded with the playing of the Specials' "Free Nelson Mandela". The motion to play the song to conclude every student event until Nelson Mandela was freed from prison was passed by the Wadham Student Union in 1987, when Wadham alumnus Simon Milner (History, 1985), now Policy Director at Facebook, was SU President. Following Mandela's liberation, the Student Union voted to continue the tradition as a mark of affection. President Mandela visited Wadham College and dined there on 11 July 1997. In 2017, this tradition was challenged by a South African student, who is a member of the ANC and active in equality campaigning in South Africa, as no longer appropriate given the complex legacy of Mandela in post-Apartheid South Africa. He also highlighted that there is much more to South Africa than just the history of Apartheid, and that constant reference to it rather than South Africa's current issues is outdated and no longer the progressive act it was intended to be. A vote to remove the constitutional requirement to play the song was narrowly defeated in a Wadham SU meeting.

In 2013 the warden, Lord Macdonald of River Glaven QC, created the Wadham Human Rights Forum, a new public forum for the discussion of human rights issues that welcomes top level speakers to Wadham College. Lord Macdonald was also frequently in the media speaking on legal issues and, particularly, on issues relating to rights and security.

== Buildings ==
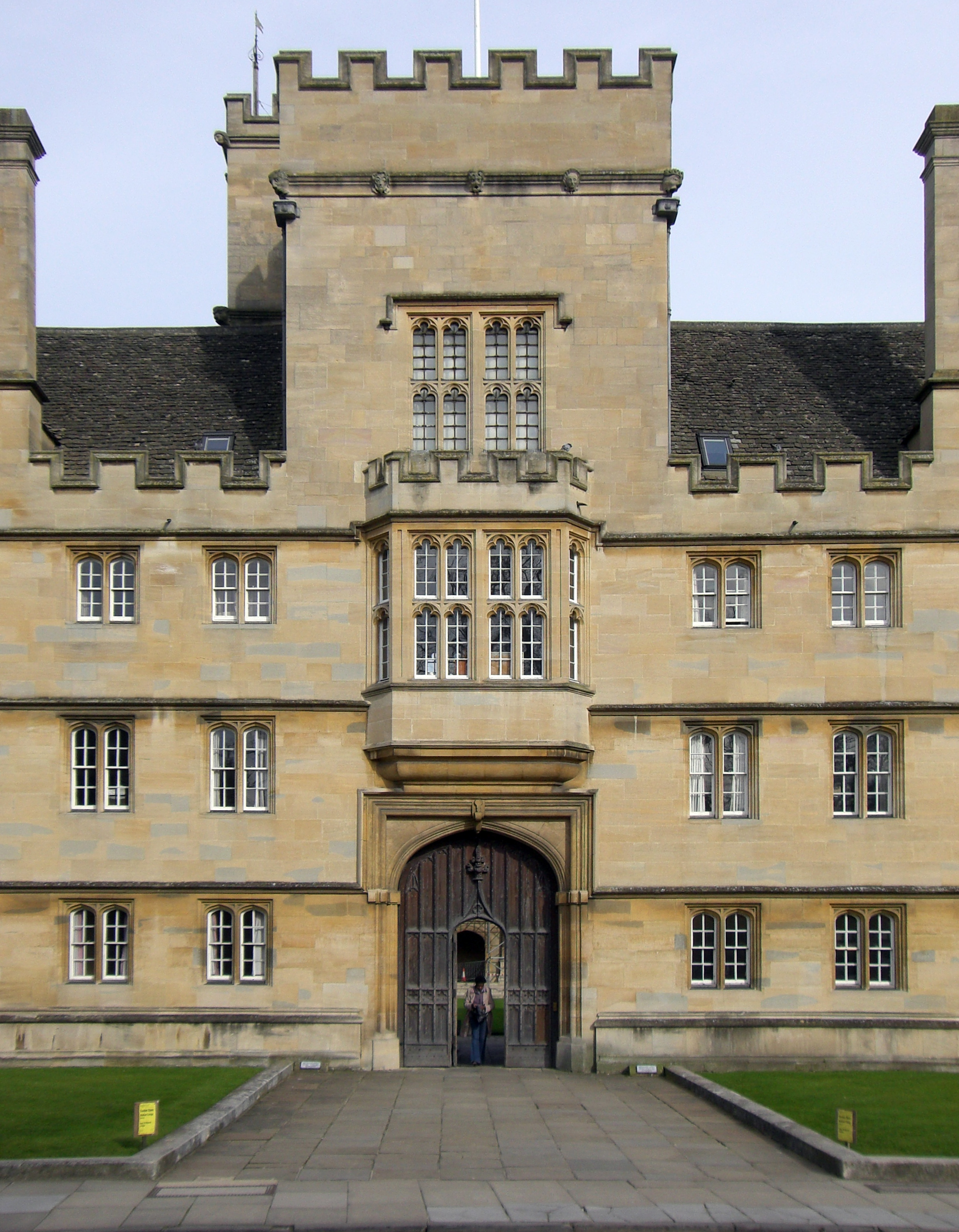
College entrance on Parks Road

=== Front quad ===
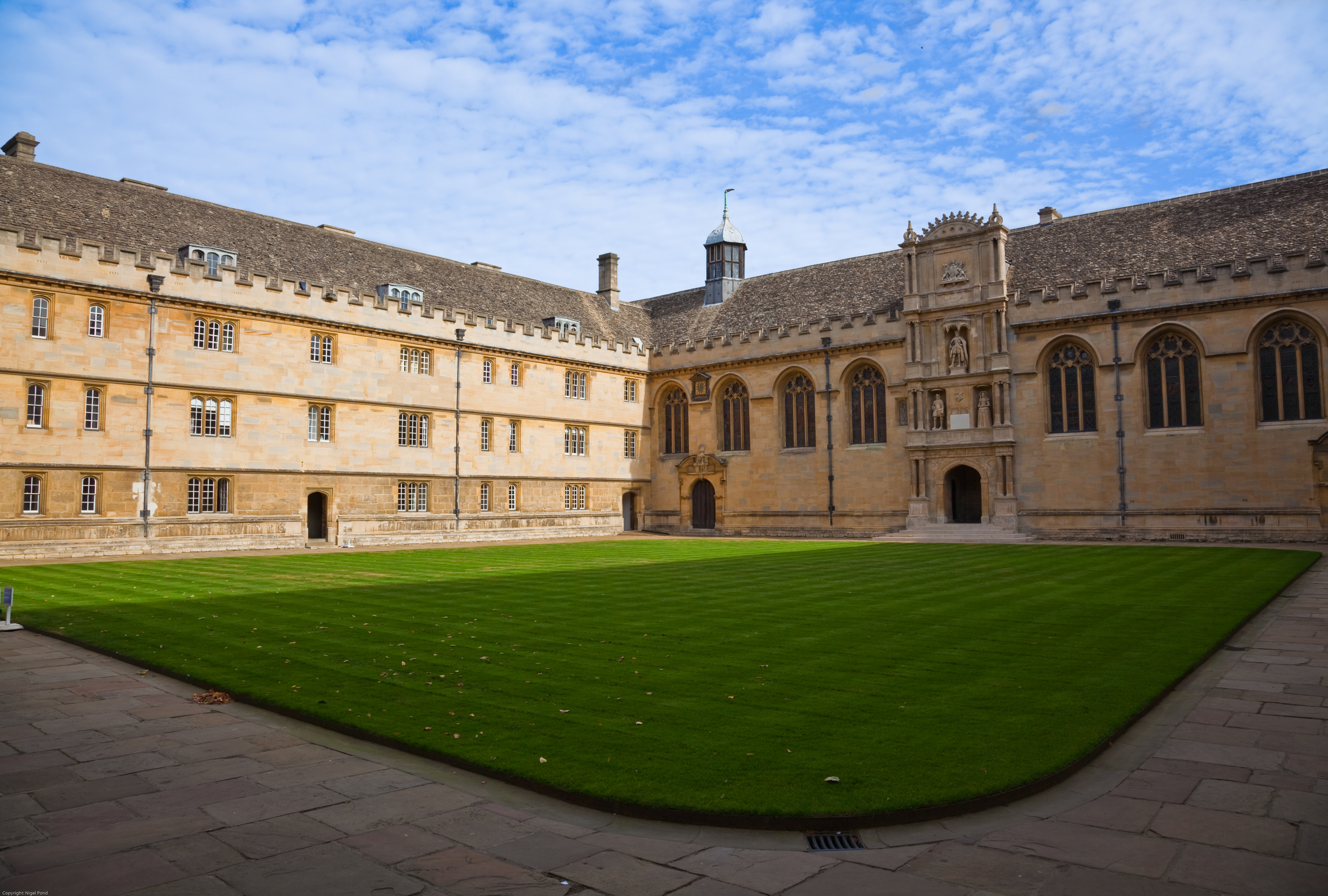
Front quad

Wadham is sometimes put forward as the last major English public building to be created according to the mediaeval tradition of the Master Mason. Wadham's front quadrangle (quad), which served as almost the entire college until the mid-20th century, is also an early example of the "Jacobean Gothic" style that was adopted for many of the university's buildings.

The main building was erected in a single building operation in 1610–1613. The architect, William Arnold, was also responsible for Montacute House and Dunster Castle in Somerset, and was involved in the building of Cranborne Manor, Dorset for Robert Cecil, 1st Earl of Salisbury, James I's Lord Treasurer. The style of the building is a fairly traditional Oxford Gothic, modified by classical decorative detail, most notably the 'frontispiece' framing statues of James I and the Founders immediately facing visitors as they enter the college. Classical, too, is the over-powering emphasis on symmetry. The central quadrangle was originally gravelled throughout; the present lawn was laid down in 1809. The college was refaced in the 1960s, and much of the front quad has undergone further restoration work.

In 2019 a new 135 bed student accommodation was completed for the campus.

=== Hall ===
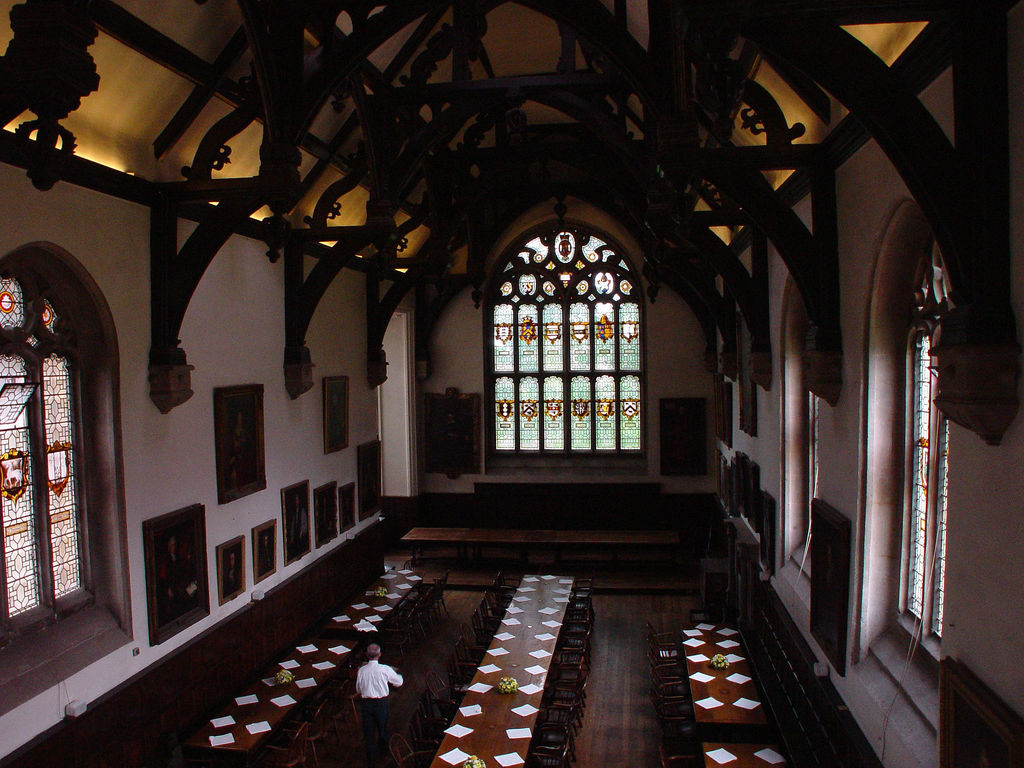
Hall

In 1898, the hall was the third largest amongst Oxford colleges after Christ Church and New College. It is notable for its great hammer-beam roof and for the Jacobean woodwork of the entrance screen. The portraits include those of the founders and of distinguished members of the college. The large portrait in the gallery is of John Lovelace, who held Oxford for William of Orange during the Revolution of 1688; the inscription records his role in freeing England 'from popery and slavery'.

=== Chapel ===
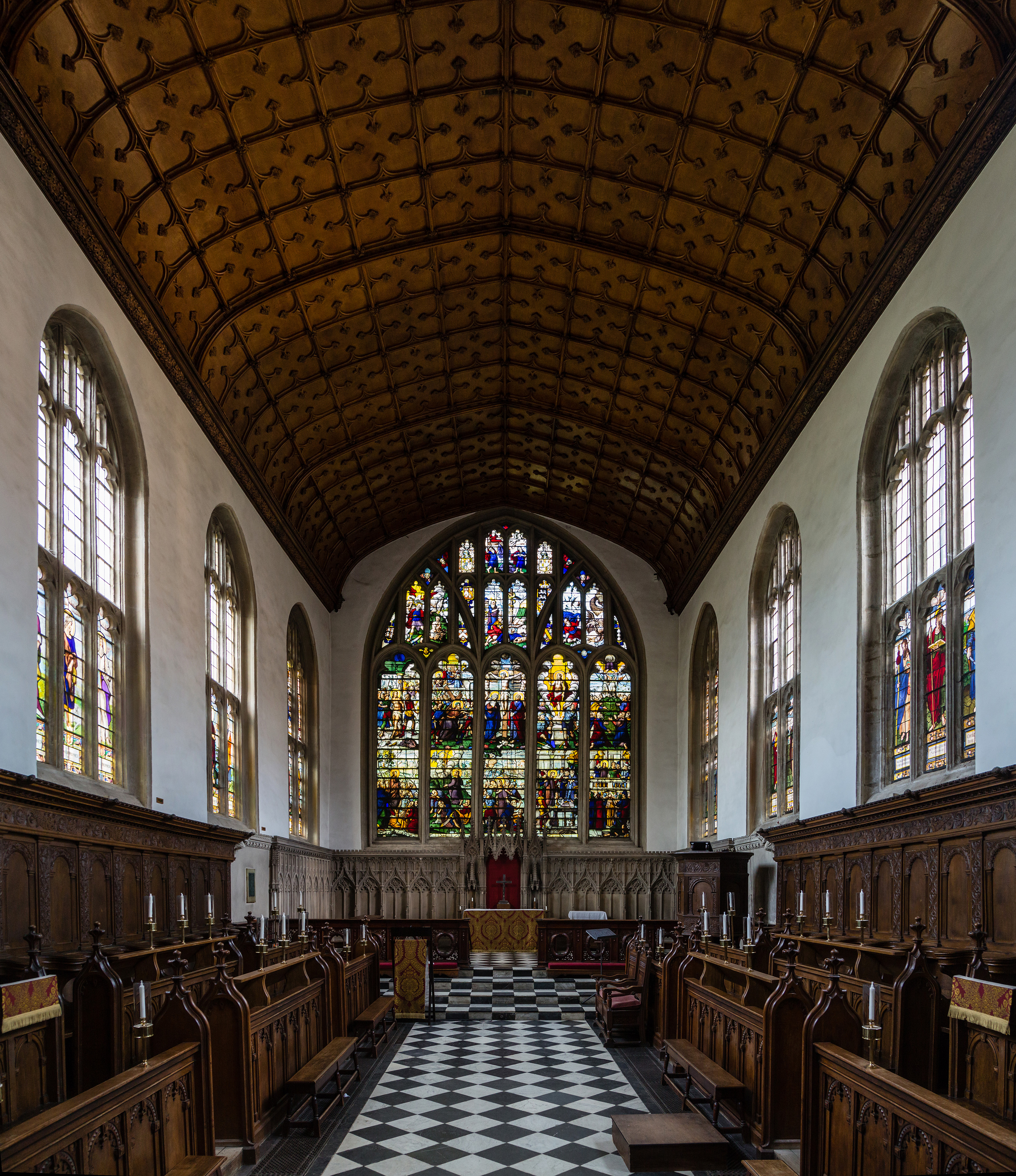
Chapel

Although a ceremonial door opens directly into Front Quad, the chapel is usually reached through the door in staircase 3. The screen, similar to that in the hall, was carved by John Bolton. Originally Jacobean woodwork ran right round the chapel. The present stone reredos was inserted in the east end in 1834. The elegant young man reclining on his monument is Sir John Portman, baronet, who died in 1624 as a nineteen-year-old undergraduate. Another monument is in the form of a pile of books; it commemorates Thomas Harris, one of the fellows of the college appointed at the foundation. The Chapel organ dates from 1862 and 1886. It is one of the few instruments by Henry Willis, the doyen of Victorian English organ builders, to survive without substantial modification of its tonal design.

==== Windows ====
The East Window, which depicts several scenes from the Old and New Testaments, was created by Bernard van Linge in 1622. The windows on the north and south sides of the chapel depict various Old Testament prophets, such as Jonah, and apostles, such as St Andrew. They originate from different periods. One window is dated 1616, and attributed to Robert Rutland, a local craftsman. The windows of the antechapel, which also show saintly figures, are Victorian. They were designed by John Bridges, and created by David Evans in 1838.

=== Back Quad ===
Limited additions were made during the 18th and 19th centuries, including a converted warehouse originally used to store Bibles. A series of expansions since 1952 have made use of a range of 17th- and 18th-century houses and several modern buildings to create a Back Quad between the Front Quad and Holywell Street.

=== Bar Quad ===
The small quadrangle formed by the Junior Common Room, the William Doo Undergraduate Centre, the Dr. Lee Shau Kee Building, the Holywell Music Room and (latterly) the Bowra Building was sometimes known to students as the "Ho Chi Minh" quad. It is thought to have been thus named (in honour of Vietnamese revolutionary leader Ho Chi Minh) during the period of student radicalism in the 1960s.

=== Holywell Music Room ===
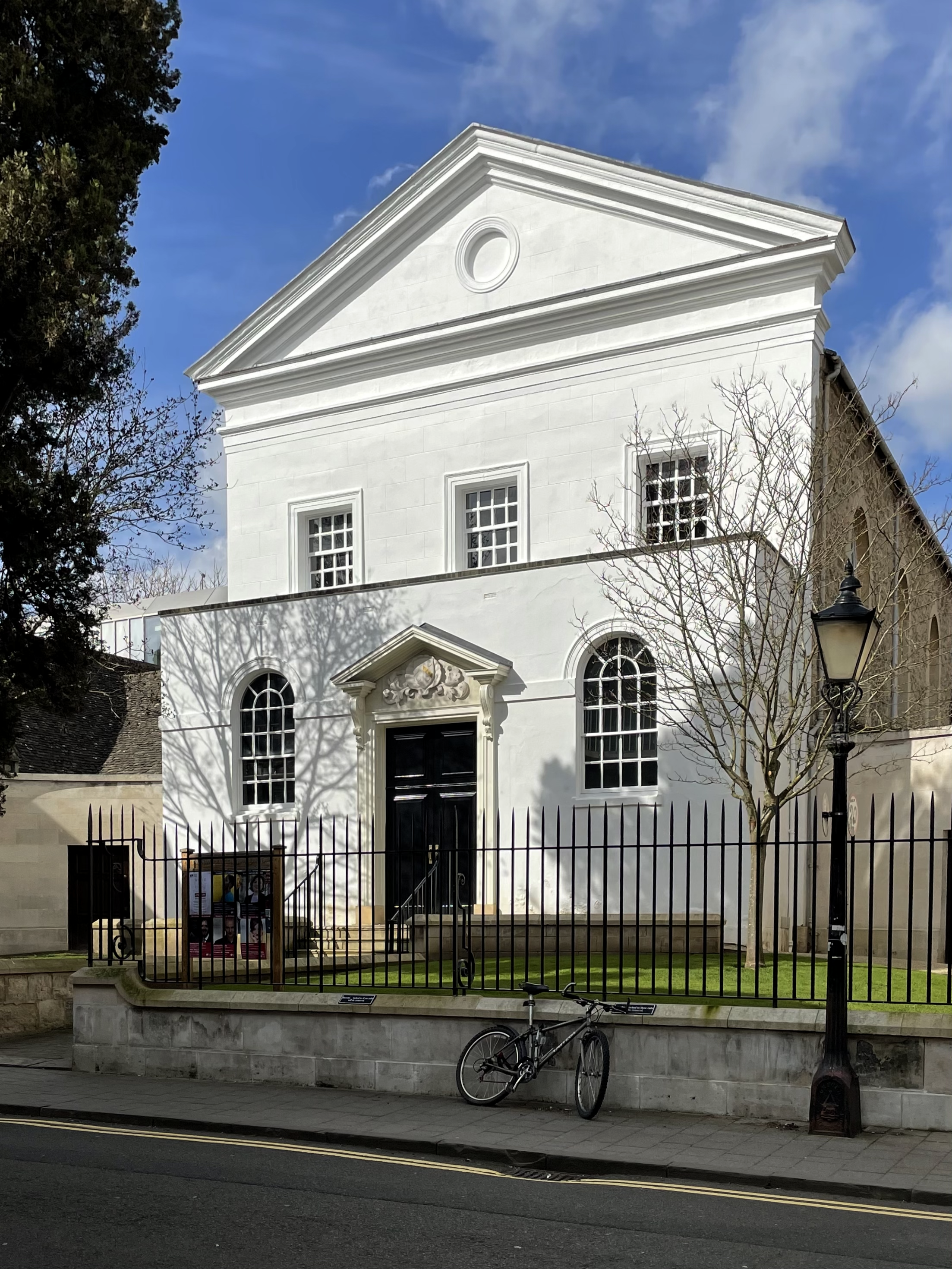
Holywell Music Room in 2021

The college grounds contain the Holywell Music Room. This is said to be the oldest purpose-built music room in Europe, and hence England's first concert hall. It was designed by Thomas Camplin, at that time Vice-Principal of St Edmund Hall, and opened in July 1748. The interior has been restored to a near-replica of the original and contains the only surviving Donaldson organ, built in 1790 by John Donaldson of Newcastle and installed in 1985 after being restored.

=== Ferdowsi Library ===
The Ferdowsi Library (formerly the Ashraf Pahlavi Library) specialises in Persian literature, art, history, and culture. It possesses about 3,500 volumes, almost 800 manuscripts, about 200 lithographs in Arabic and Persian, and about 700 rare and early Armenian books, most of which were donated by Dr. Caro Minasian.

At the end of the 1960s, the Warden, Maurice Bowra, President of the British Academy and one of the first co-founders of the British Institute of Persian Studies (BIPS), welcomed a donation to construct the building of the New Library in Wadham, where the emphasis would be given to Persian Studies and the post in Persian. Since then a special connection between Wadham and Iran has been established.

The Wadham library building was initially funded by donations from the then (1976) Iranian ruling family, the Pahlavi dynasty. The funds were secured by Fellow and tutor in economics, Eprime Eshag. The building, with associated accommodation blocks, was designed by Gillespie, Kidd & Coia. Today the library is open 24/7 and has wireless connectivity throughout.

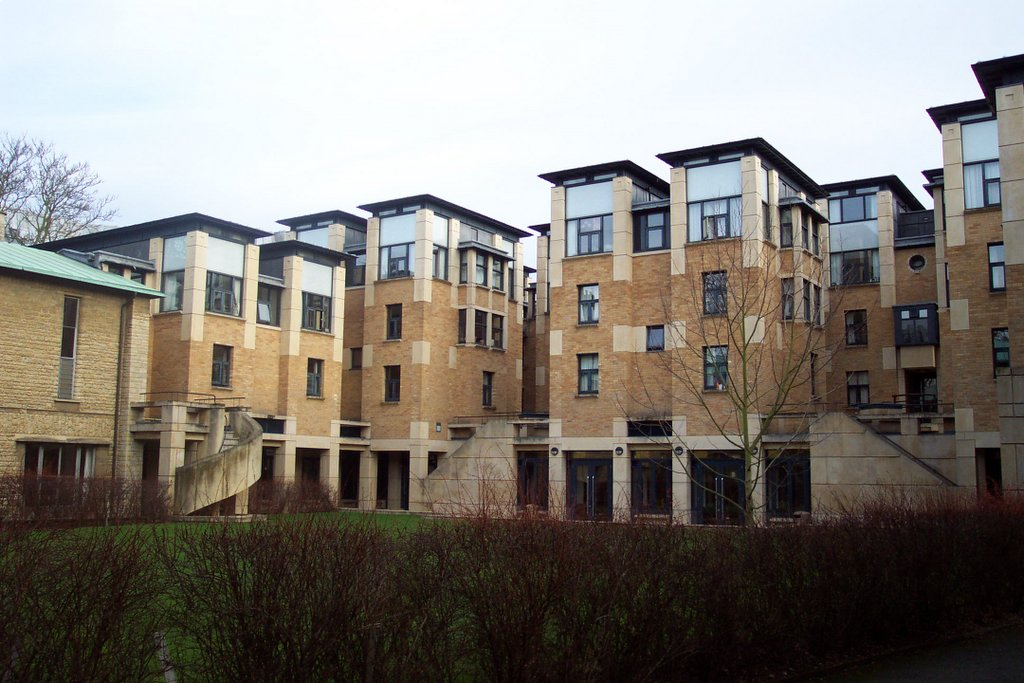
The Bowra Building by Sir Richard MacCormac

=== Bowra Building ===
The Bowra Building next to the Ferdowsi Library and Bar Quad was designed by Sir Richard MacCormac and opened in 1992. It includes a cafeteria, gym, seminar rooms, squash court and the Moser Theatre as well as student rooms. It also included a bar, which has since been moved to the Dr Lee Shau Kee Building and William Doo Undergraduate Centre.

=== McCall MacBain Graduate Centre ===
The McCall MacBain Graduate Centre was designed by Lee/Fitzgerald Architects and opened in 2012. It won a 2014 Riba Regional Award and Conservation Award. It provides a dedicated social and study space for Wadham's graduate students on the main site of Wadham college.

=== Dr Lee Shau Kee Building and William Doo Undergraduate Centre ===
The Dr Lee Shau Kee Building and William Doo Undergraduate Centre were designed by Amanda Levete Architects. They replaced the Goddard building of 1951 and now provide facilities for the college's access activities and student union. Construction began in 2018 and was completed in late 2020.

=== Merifield ===
The Merifield annexe, named after Merryfield, Ilton once home to the Wadhams, is in Summertown, about 1.2 miles from the centre of Oxford. Most of the graduate student accommodation is at Merifield.

=== Dorothy Wadham Building ===
The Dorothy Wadham Building, on Iffley Road, was designed by Allies and Morrison and opened in 2019. It houses undergraduates, predominantly in their second year of studies.

== Gardens ==
Wadham Gardens are relatively large when compared with those of other Oxford colleges, even without the land sold to build Rhodes House in the 1920s. Originally a series of orchards and market-gardens carved out from the property of the previously existing Augustinian priory, their appearance and configuration have been significantly modified over the course of the last four hundred years to reflect their constantly changing functional and aesthetic purpose.

The land was shaped, in particular, by two major periods of planning. Gardens were first created under Warden Wilkins (1648–1659) as a series of formal rectangles laid out around a (then fashionable) mound which was, in turn, surmounted by a figure of Atlas. These gardens were notable not least for their collection of mechanical contrivances (including a talking statue and a rainbow-maker), a number of obelisks and a Doric temple. Under Warden Wills (1783–1806), the terrain was then radically remodelled and landscaped (by Shipley) and became notable for a distinguished collection of trees.

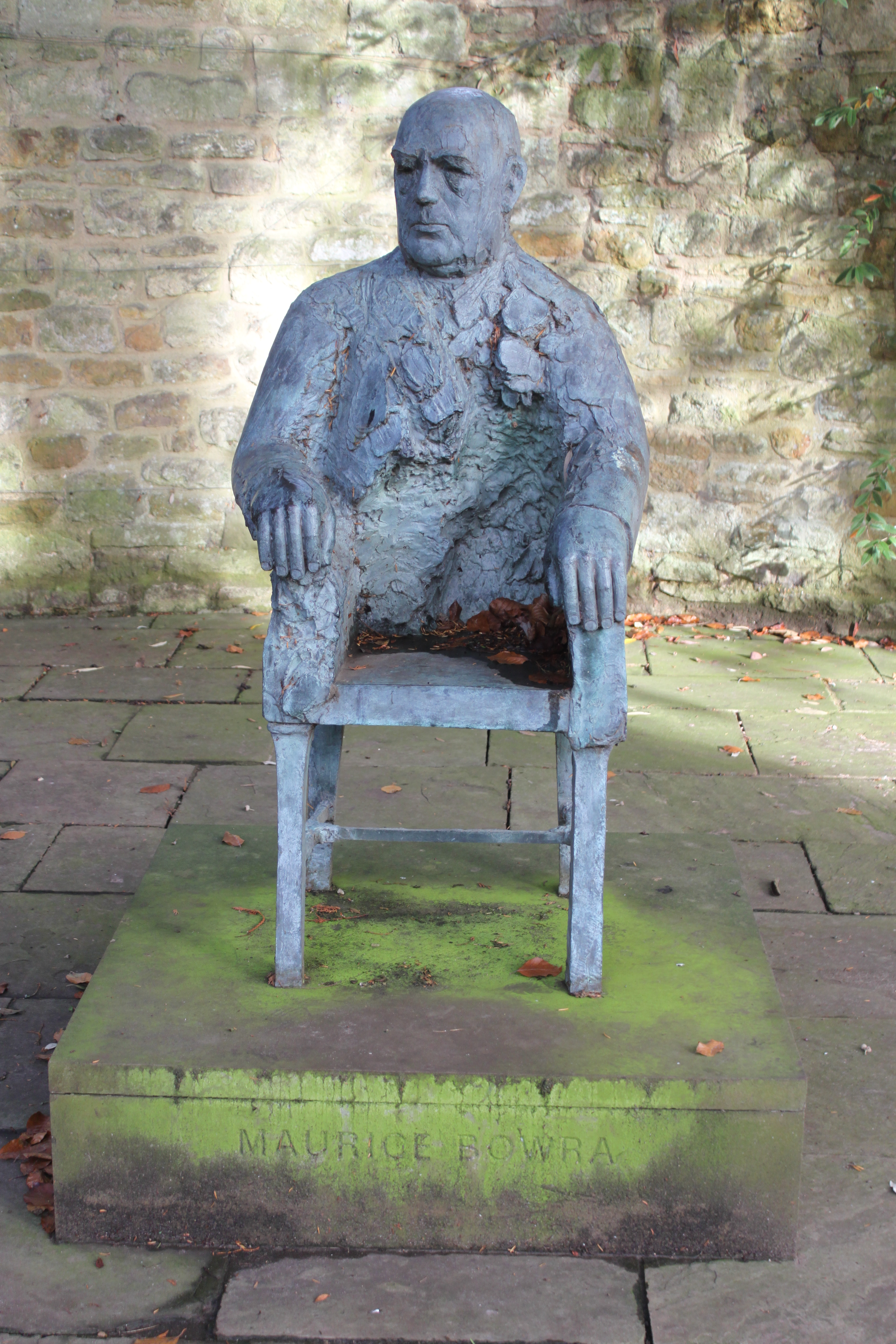
Sculpture of Maurice Bowra in the college gardens

Restored and reshaped following the Second World War, the present Gardens are divided into the Warden's Garden, the Fellows' Private Garden and the Fellows' Garden, together with the Cloister Garden (originally the cemetery) and the White Scented Garden.

They are still notable for their collection of trees (specimens include a holm oak, silver pendant lime, tulip tree, golden yew, purple beech, cedar of Lebanon, ginkgo, giant redwood, tree of heaven, incense cedar, Corsican pine, magnolia and a rare Chinese gutta-percha) and they still contain a number of vestigial curiosities from the past (notably an 18th-century 'cowshed' set into the remnants of the Royalist earthworks of 1642, one of the second generation of 'Emperors Heads' that adorned the Sheldonian Theatre from 1868 to around 1970, and a sculpture of Warden Bowra).

== Student life ==
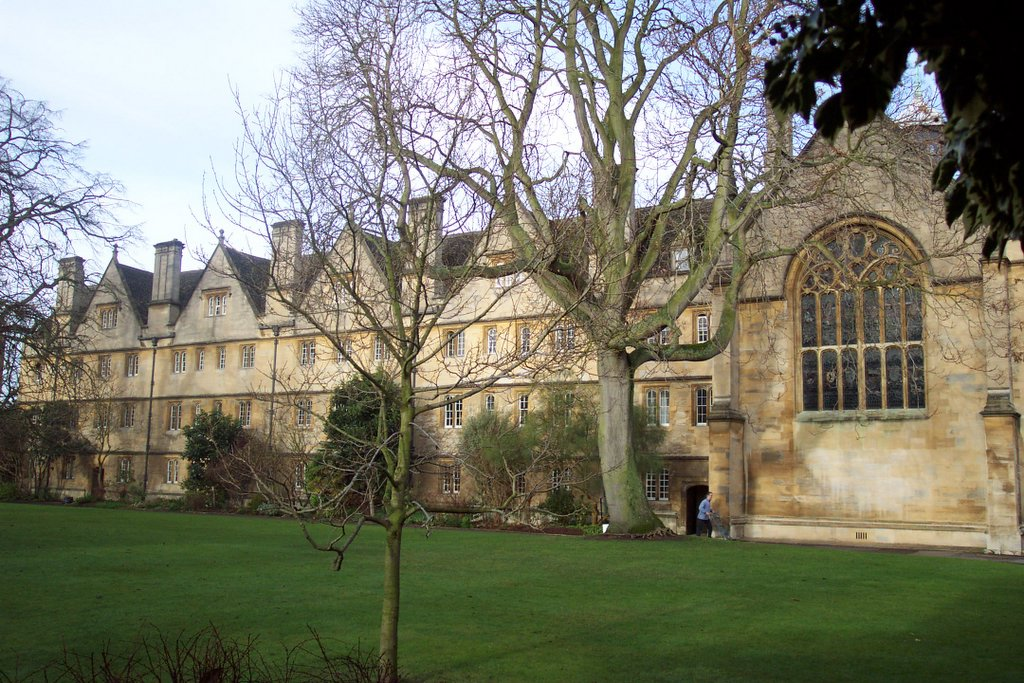
Back quad

Undergraduate students at Wadham are offered accommodation for all years of their course. Accommodation is provided within college for the first and final years of their course, and during the second (or fourth) year within the newly constructed Dorothy Wadham Building, on Iffley Road, or within the Merifield annexe in Summertown.

Since 1976, Wadham has been distinctive in having a Student Union, which in principle represents both undergraduate and graduate members. In practice the SU is more concerned with undergraduate interests and activities, whilst the separate MCR committee represents graduate students.

All students can use the on-site facilities such as the Moser Theatre, squash court, gym, kitchen, laundry room, music practice rooms and various meeting rooms. The JCR Lounge is the main common room space used by undergraduate students, along with the bar. Since 2012 the MCR has had its own social area in the McCall MacBain Graduate Centre, with its kitchen, small bar, and media room. The college sports ground is located in Summertown, adjoining the Merifield residential complex.

The Wadham JCR common room consists of a pool table and a table tennis table. Famously, this has been the home of the Wadham bar sports team for over 15 years which has now grown to over 30 members. Notable alumni include influential figures from the finance, tech and legal sectors, in particular BlackRock, Google and Hogan Lovells. An annual dinner is an important part of student life and has brought the years together over a shared love of pool and darts. In 2022 the Wadham pool team set a new record with a 78% frame win rate in Cuppers.

Wadham has a student exchange programme with the Sarah Lawrence College in New York. About 30 students come each year and live at Merifield, and about six Wadham students go to SLC in the spring each year for 3 weeks.

There are elected welfare officers on both the SU and MCR committees. There is a general welfare room, as well as a women's room. The college also has a nurse who runs an open surgery.

Wadham has a relatively high number of state school students, compared to other Oxford colleges. Wadham hosts Queerfest (formerly Queer Bop), and Wadstock (a twelve-hour live music festival named after Woodstock). It also hosts bops five times a term in Michaelmas term and Hilary term. A Wadham student tradition is that events are always concluded with the playing of Free Nelson Mandela.

There are three football teams, two chess teams, a cricket team, a boat club, a hockey team with Trinity, trampolining Cuppers side (mixed); Gaelic Football Cuppers side, men's darts, men's rugby, women's rugby Fives, mixed pool as well as Ultimate Frisbee. There is also Wadham Women's Weightlifting, an inclusive weightlifting club for marginalised genders.

Wadham College Boat Club is the rowing club for students at Wadham, and it also allows Harris Manchester College students to join. The college boat house is located on Boathouse Island.

== Anecdotes and curiosities ==
- Under the original statutes, women were forbidden from entering the college, with the exception of a laundress who was to be of 'such age, condition, and reputation as to be above suspicion.'
- Wadham had amongst its fellowship the notable poet John Wilmot, 2nd Earl of Rochester (1647–1680) who earned a reputation as the most famous womanizer of his era. The 2004 movie The Libertine, which starred Johnny Depp as Rochester, coincidentally also starred Rosamund Pike, a Wadham alumna.
- In 1739 the warden of Wadham, Robert Thistlethwayte, fled England after a homosexual scandal. The event prompted the limerick:

There once was a Warden of Wadham
Who approved of the folkways of Sodom,
For a man might, he said,
Have a very poor head
But be a fine Fellow at bottom.

The college was renowned for its relaxed attitude to homosexuality, and revelled in its nickname of 'Sodom'.

- In 1968, as student protests became commonplace at centres of learning in Europe and the Americas, the Warden and Fellows are reported to have sent this reply to a set of "non-negotiable demands":
  Dear Gentlemen: We note your threat to take what you call 'direct action' unless your demands are immediately met. We feel it is only sporting to remind you that our governing body includes three experts in chemical warfare, two ex-commandos skilled with dynamite and torturing prisoners, four qualified marksmen in both small arms and rifles, two ex-artillerymen, one holder of the Victoria Cross, four karate experts and a chaplain. The governing body has authorized me to tell you that we look forward with confidence to what you call a 'confrontation,' and I may say, with anticipation.
  The letter seemed to have dimmed the students' fire, was reprinted in Harper's Bazaar, and cited in newspaper columns and speeches for at least two years following its publication.
- In the days when Oxford colleges locked their gates overnight, Wadham was regarded as a particularly difficult college to climb into after the gates closed. One route into the college was said to be via the Warden's Lodgings in the corner of the front quad. College legend has it that an undergraduate was quietly making his way through the lodgings when Warden Bowra entered the room. The undergraduate rapidly secreted himself behind a sofa, whilst Bowra took a book from the bookcase and settled down to read for several hours. When Bowra eventually rose to leave, he quipped "turn the lights off before you go, there's a good fellow".
- The pattern in the pavement outside the student bar at Wadham College is a Penrose tiling, named after the Wadham mathematician and Nobel Laureate Roger Penrose who invented it in the 1970s. Penrose tilings have many interesting mathematical properties, and they also explain the structure of some unusual metallic crystals, called quasicrystals, that were discovered in the 1980s and won Dan Shechtman the Nobel Prize for Chemistry in 2011.
- The 2004 animated film Pinocchio 3000, a science fiction retelling of the classic tale by Carlo Collodi, is replete with oblique visual cues and other references to various Oxford colleges, but predominantly Wadham, the alma mater of three of the senior production team.
- In January 2013, skeletons were discovered during building works on college grounds. Contrary to previous rumours of bullet wounds being found on one of the bodies, the remains were found to be medieval in origin.

== People associated with Wadham ==
=== Notable people ===
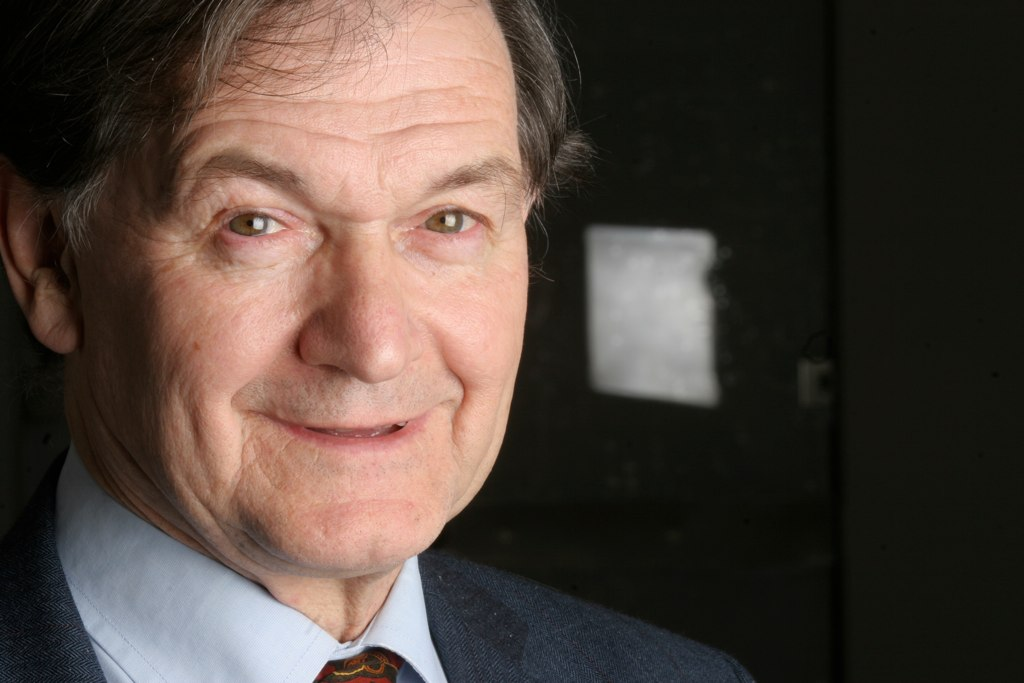
Sir Roger Penrose, Rouse Ball Professor of Mathematics (1973–1999) and Nobel Laureate

In common with many Oxford colleges, Wadham has produced a wide range of graduates in the fields of economics, history, law, physiology, medicine, management, humanities, mathematics, science, technology, media, philosophy, poetry, politics and religion who have contributed significantly to public life.

Notable members of the college in its early years include Robert Blake, Cromwell's admiral and founder of British sea-power in the Mediterranean, John Cook the first solicitor general of the English Commonwealth and prosecutor of King Charles I, the libertine poet and courtier John Wilmot 2nd Earl of Rochester, and Sir Christopher Wren. Wren attended the meetings of scientifically inclined scholars which were held by Warden John Wilkins (Cromwell's brother-in-law) in the college in the 1650s. Those attending formed the nucleus of the Royal Society at its foundation in 1662.

Wilkins invited Robert Boyle to Oxford in 1653, writing that "[I] shall be most ready to provide the best accommodations for you, that this place will afford". Boyle moved to Oxford in 1655, but preferred not to accept Wilkins's offer of accommodation, choosing instead to arrange his own rooms where he could carry out his scientific experiments. Boyle became a member of the Oxford Philosophical Club that met weekly in Wilkins's chambers at Wadham, as did Robert Hooke who became Boyle's assistant after having been a chorister at Christ Church.

Arthur Onslow (1708), a great Speaker of the House of Commons, and Richard Bethell, who became Lord Chancellor as Lord Westbury in 1861, were members of the college.

Two 20th-century Lord Chancellors, F. E. Smith (Lord Birkenhead) and John Simon, were undergraduates together in the 1890s, along with the sportsman C. B. Fry; Sir Thomas Beecham was an undergraduate in 1897, though soon abandoning Oxford for his musical career.

Frederick Lindemann, 1st Viscount Cherwell, who was Churchill's scientific adviser during the Second World War, was a fellow of the college. Cecil Day-Lewis, later Poet-Laureate, came up in 1923, and Michael Foot, later leader of the Labour Party, in 1931. Sir Maurice Bowra, scholar and wit, was Warden between 1938 and 1970. Robert Moses, the city planner, joined the college in 1911.

Among recent members have been Dr Rowan Williams, the former archbishop of Canterbury, Lord Dyson, former justice of the Supreme Court of the United Kingdom and Master of the Rolls, author and broadcaster Melvyn Bragg, writer and journalist Jonathan Freedland, novelists Hari Kunzru and Monica Ali, and Wasim Sajjad, former Chairman of the Senate of Pakistan and twice President of Pakistan. The mathematical physicist and philosopher Sir Roger Penrose was Rouse Ball Professor of Mathematics 1973–1999, and is now an emeritus fellow.

Andrew Hodges, the theoretical physicist and author of The Imitation Game, the biography of Alan Turing, is a tutorial fellow in Mathematics at Wadham. Having taught at Wadham since 1986, Hodges was elected a fellow in 2007, and was appointed dean from start of the 2011/12 academic year.

Film directors Lindsay Anderson and Tony Richardson were Wadham alumni.

Actors Rosamund Pike and Felicity Jones studied English at the College. Each has a portrait displayed in the college hall, and Pike is an honorary fellow.

Former Federal Court of Australia and Court of Appeals Judge Mark Weinberg (judge) studied the Bachelor of Civil Law at the college, for which he received the Vinerian Scholarship.

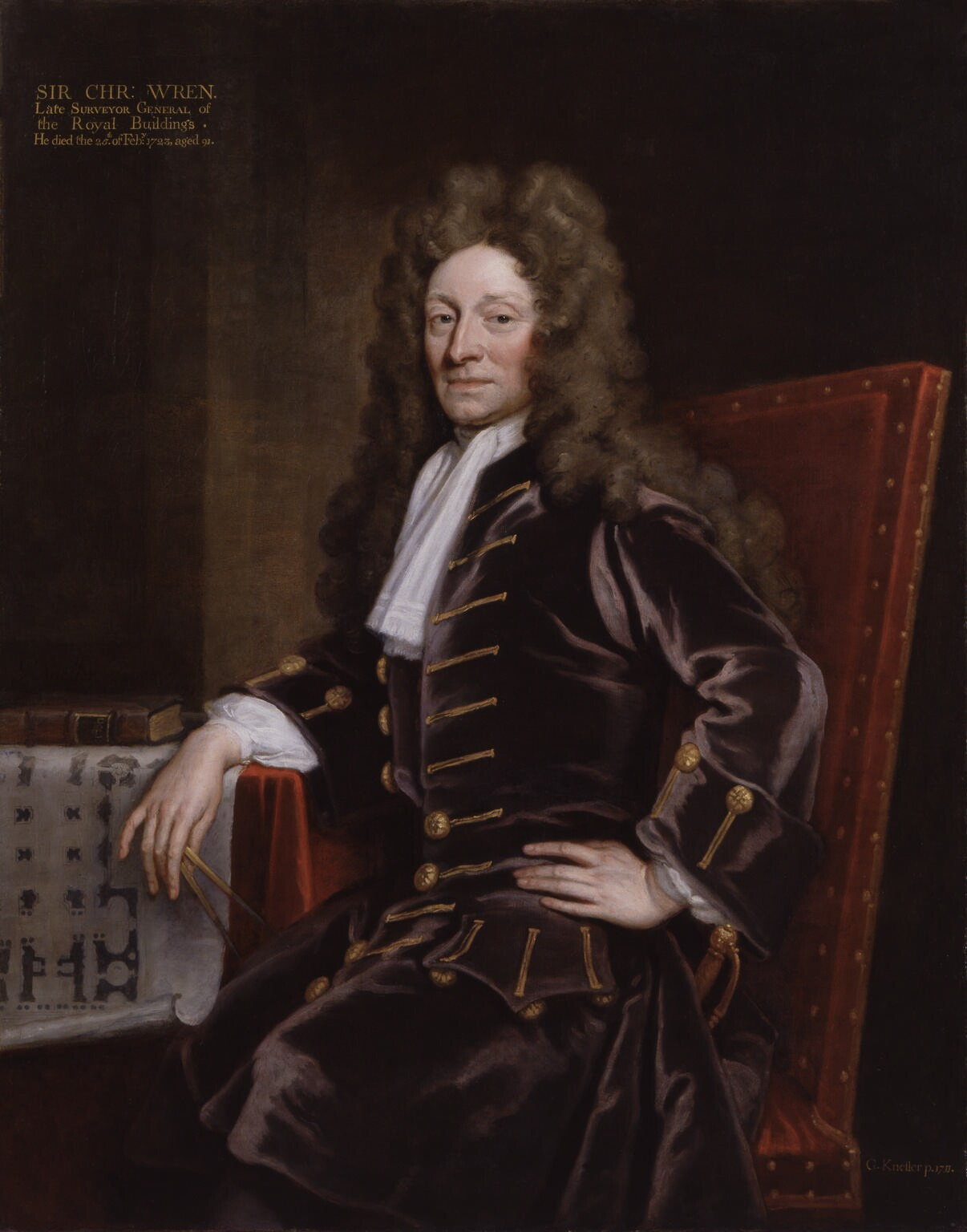
Sir Christopher Wren, architect and astronomer

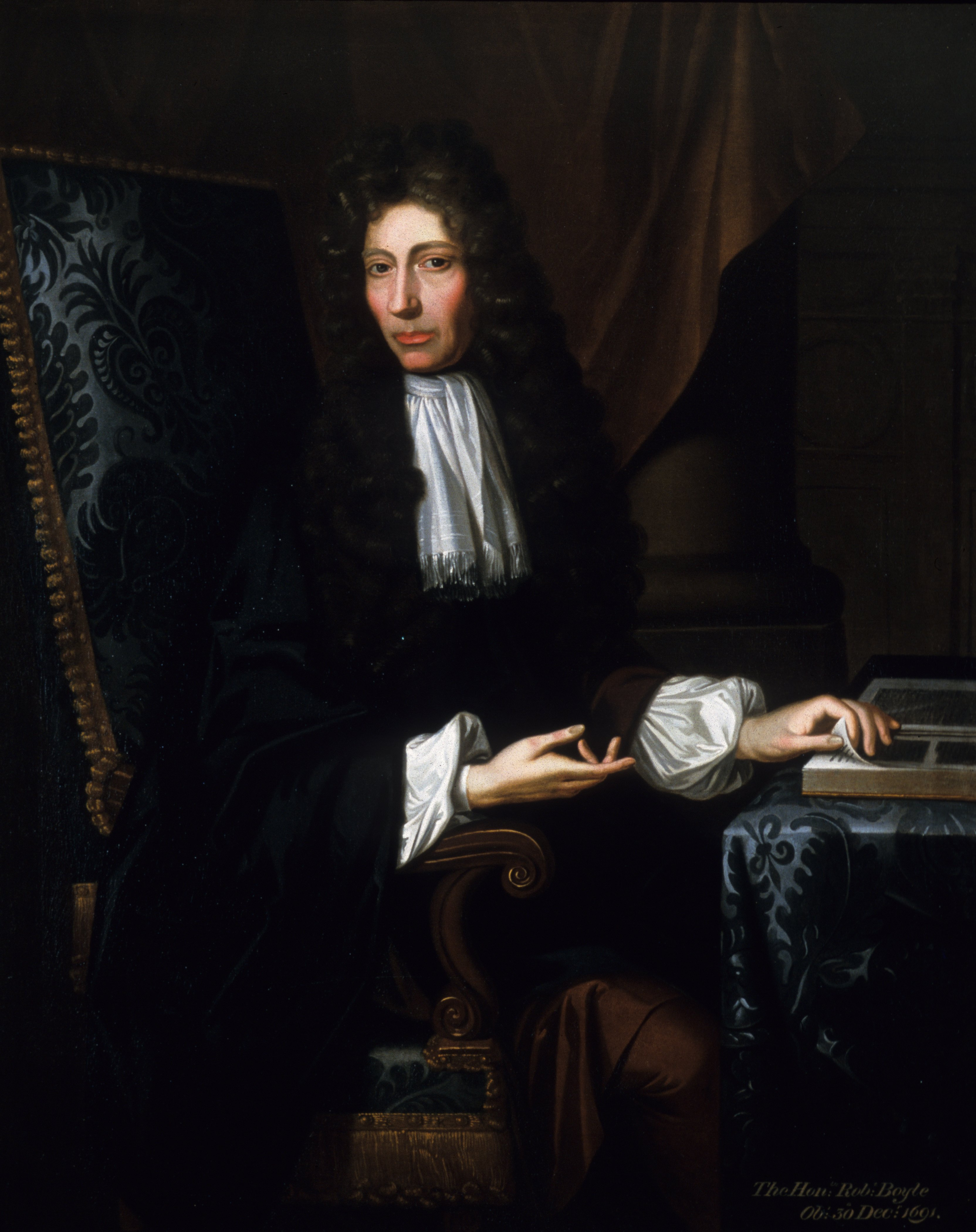
Robert Boyle, physicist

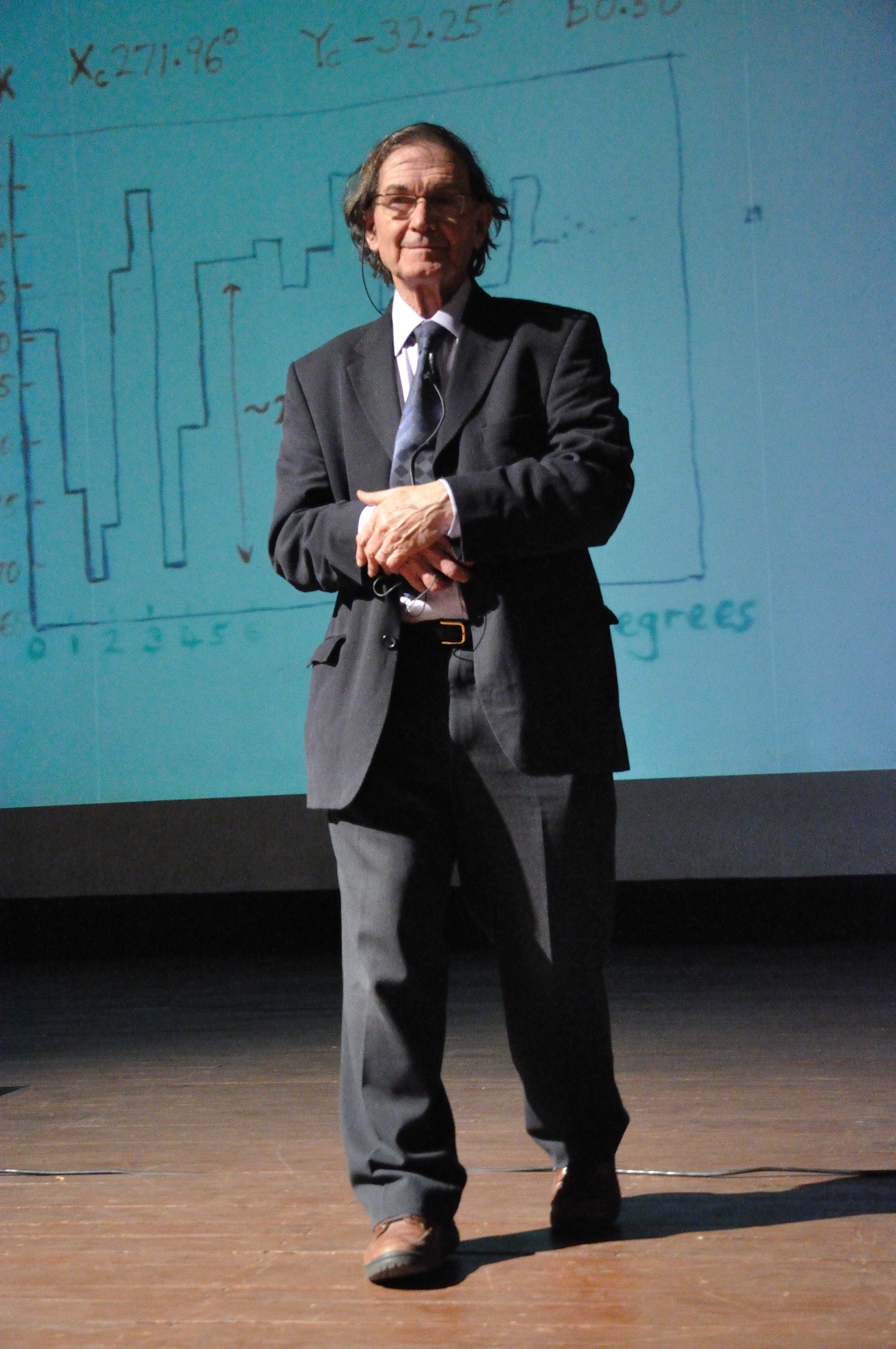
Sir Roger Penrose, mathematician

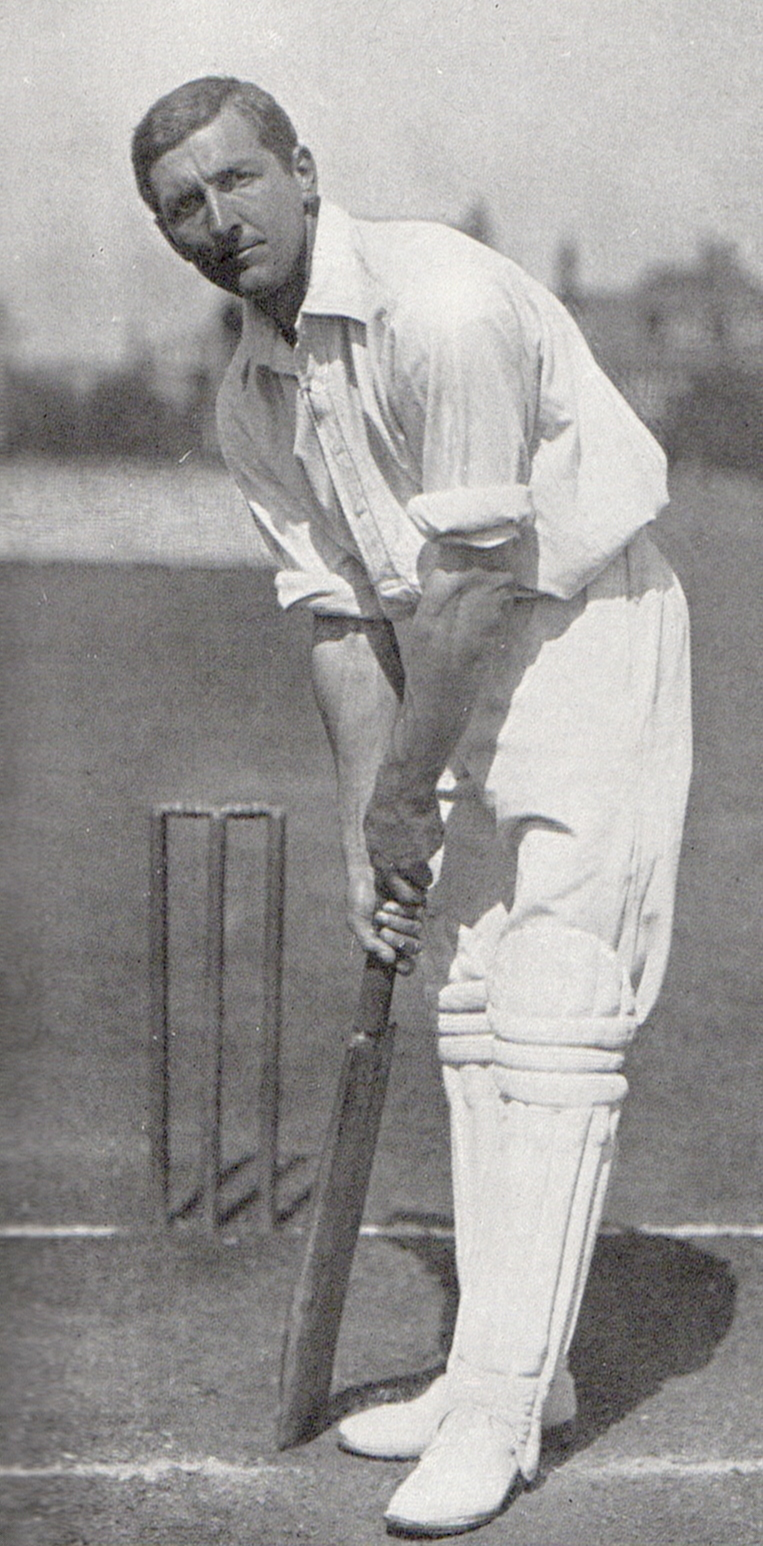
C. B. Fry, cricketer

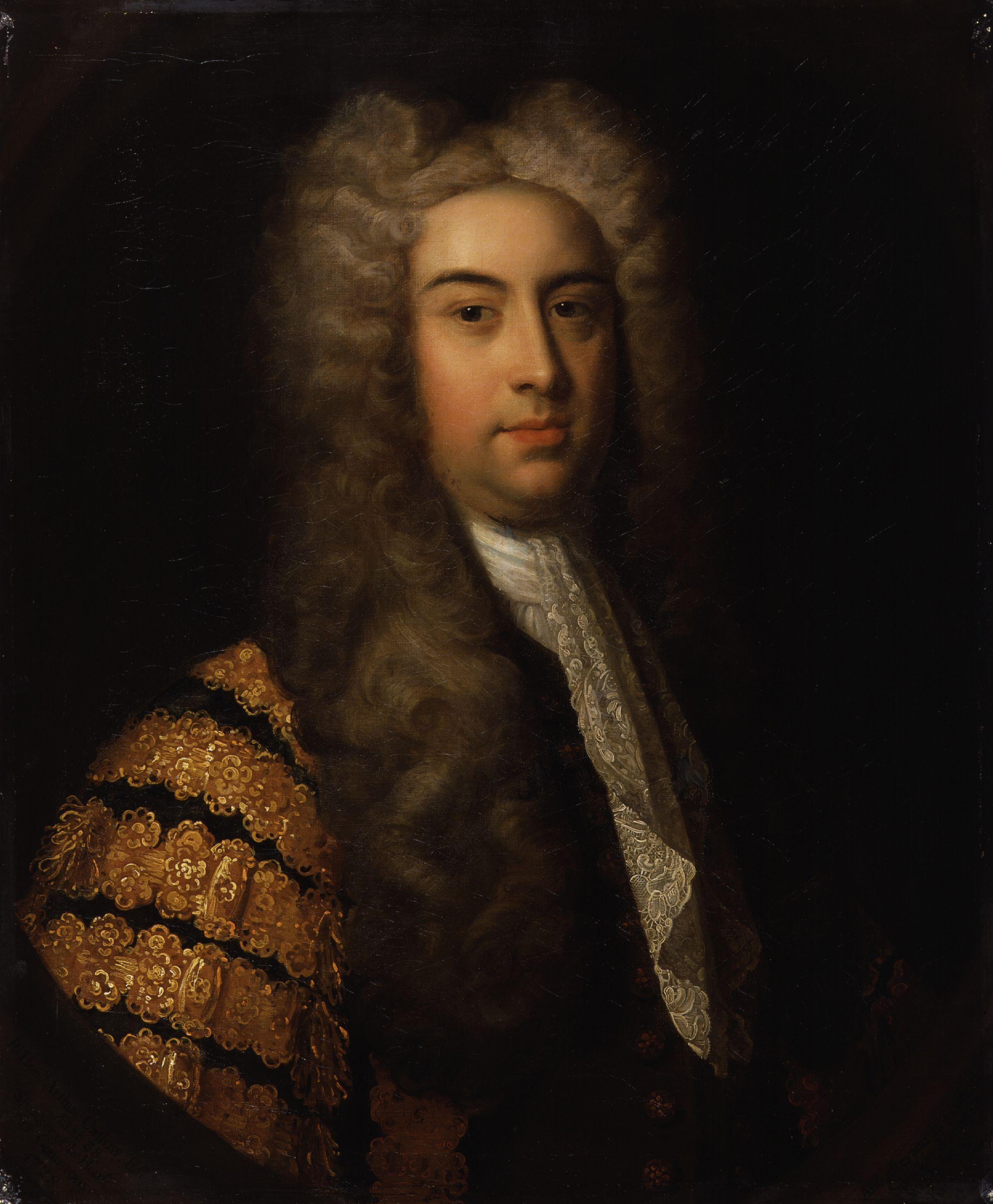
Arthur Onslow, former Speaker of the House of Commons

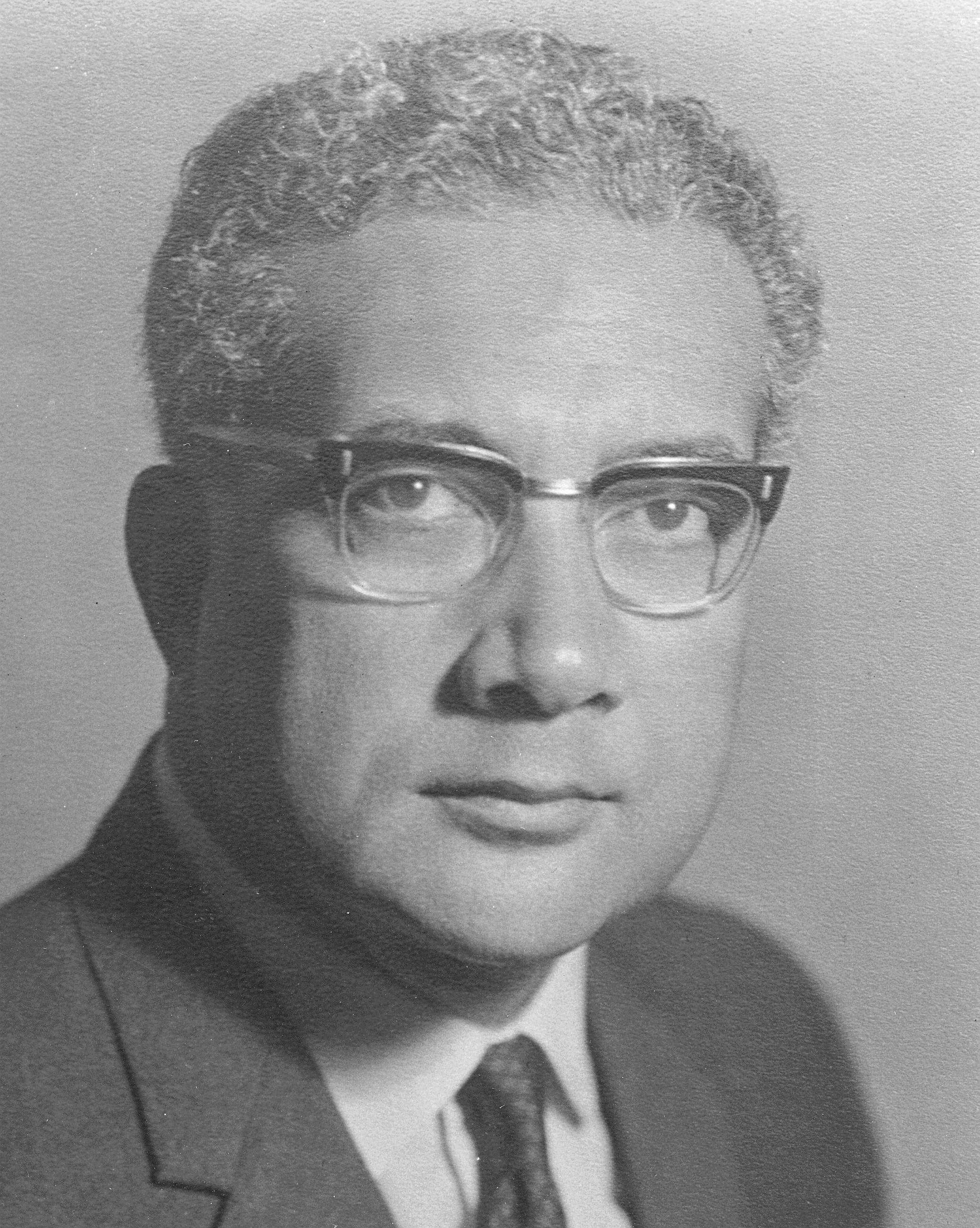
Sir Kamisese Mara, first Prime Minister of Fiji

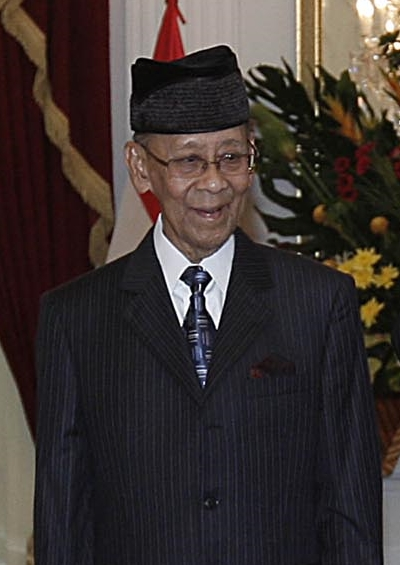
Abdul Halim of Kedah, King of Malaysia

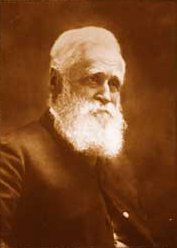
Sir William Fox, former Prime Minister of New Zealand

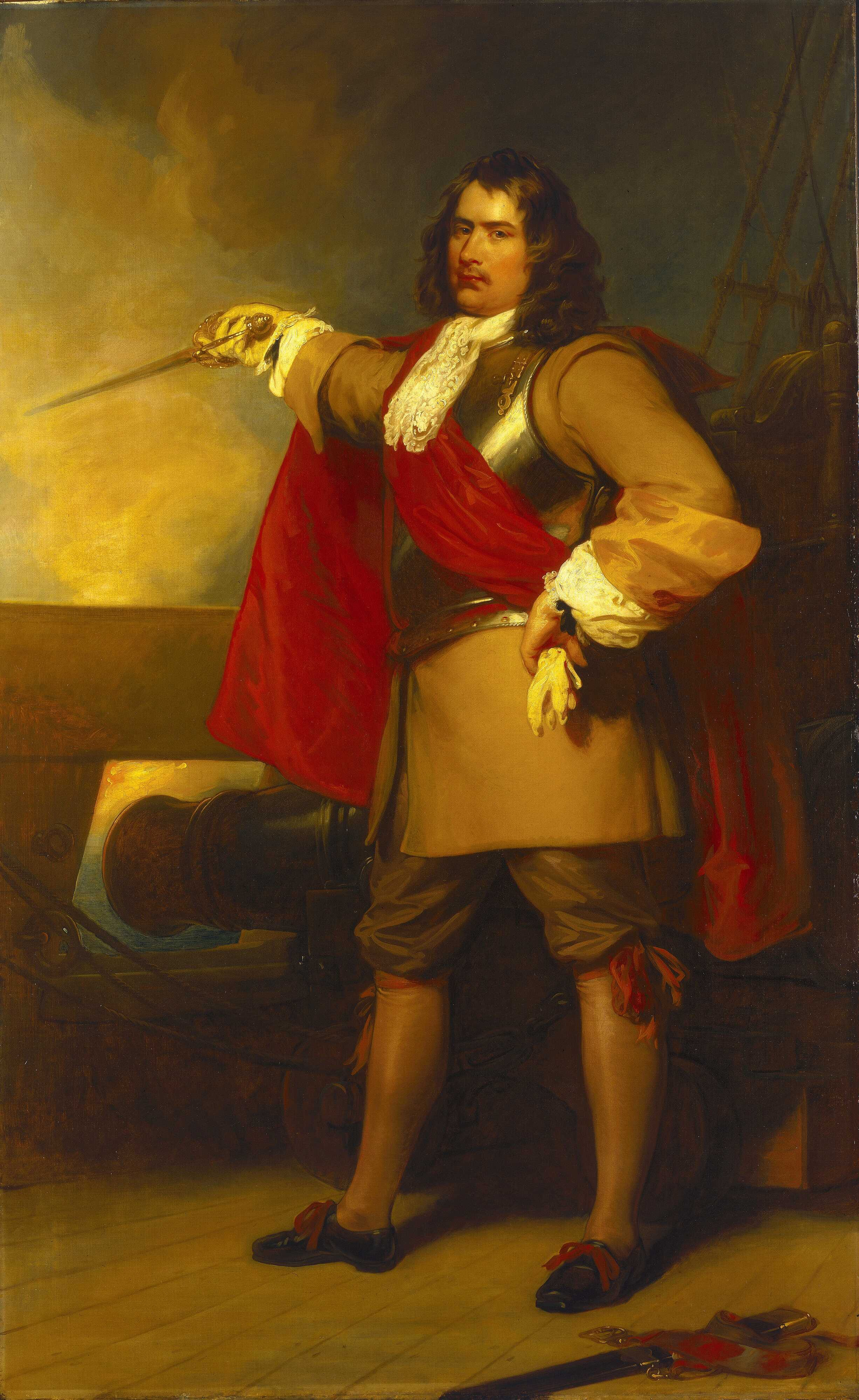
Robert Blake, Father of the Royal Navy

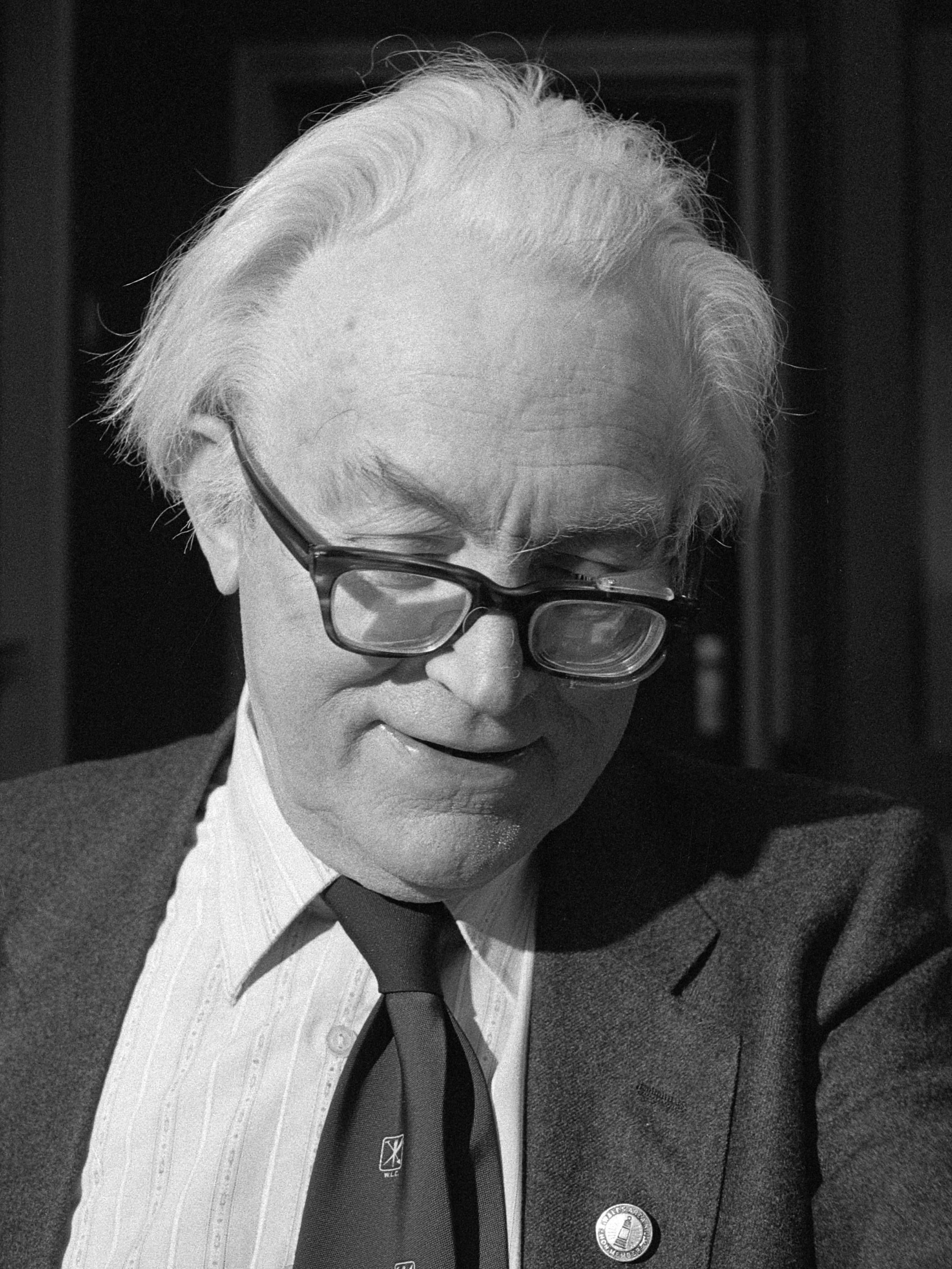
Michael Foot, former Leader of the Labour Party

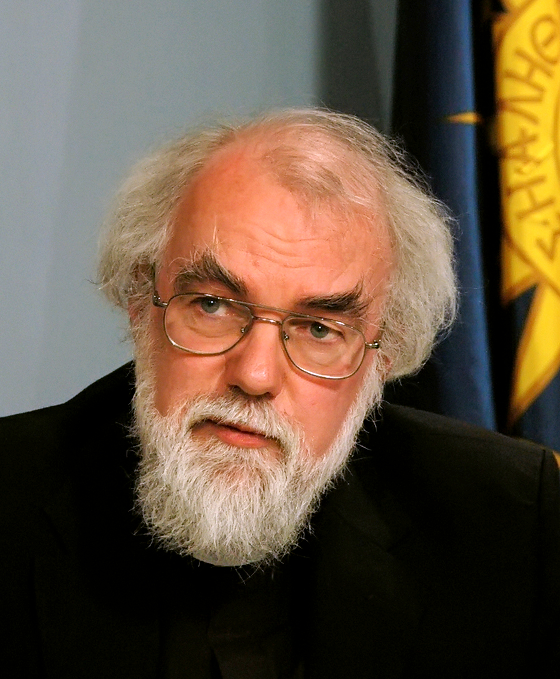
Rowan Williams, former archbishop of Canterbury

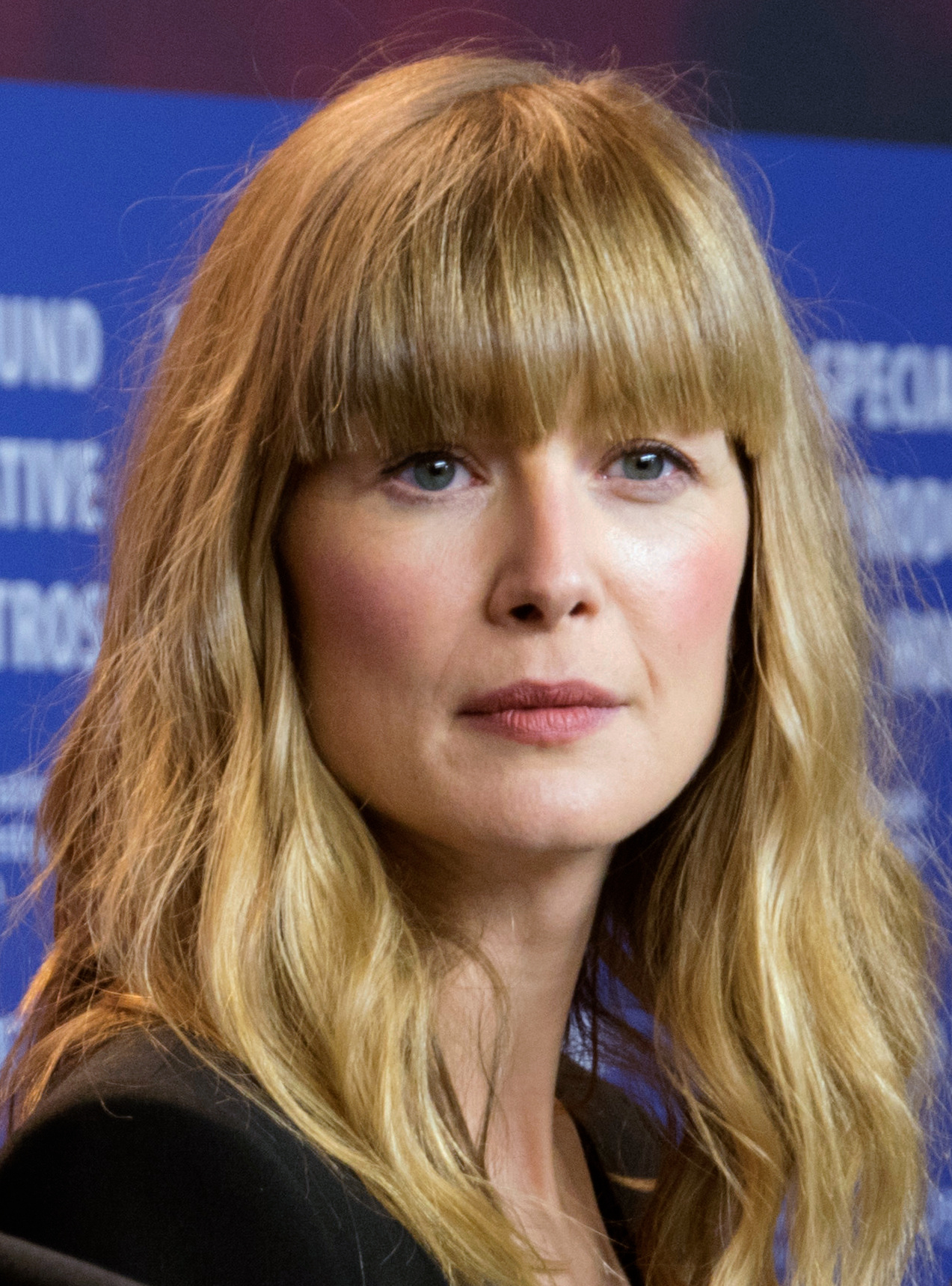
Rosamund Pike, actress

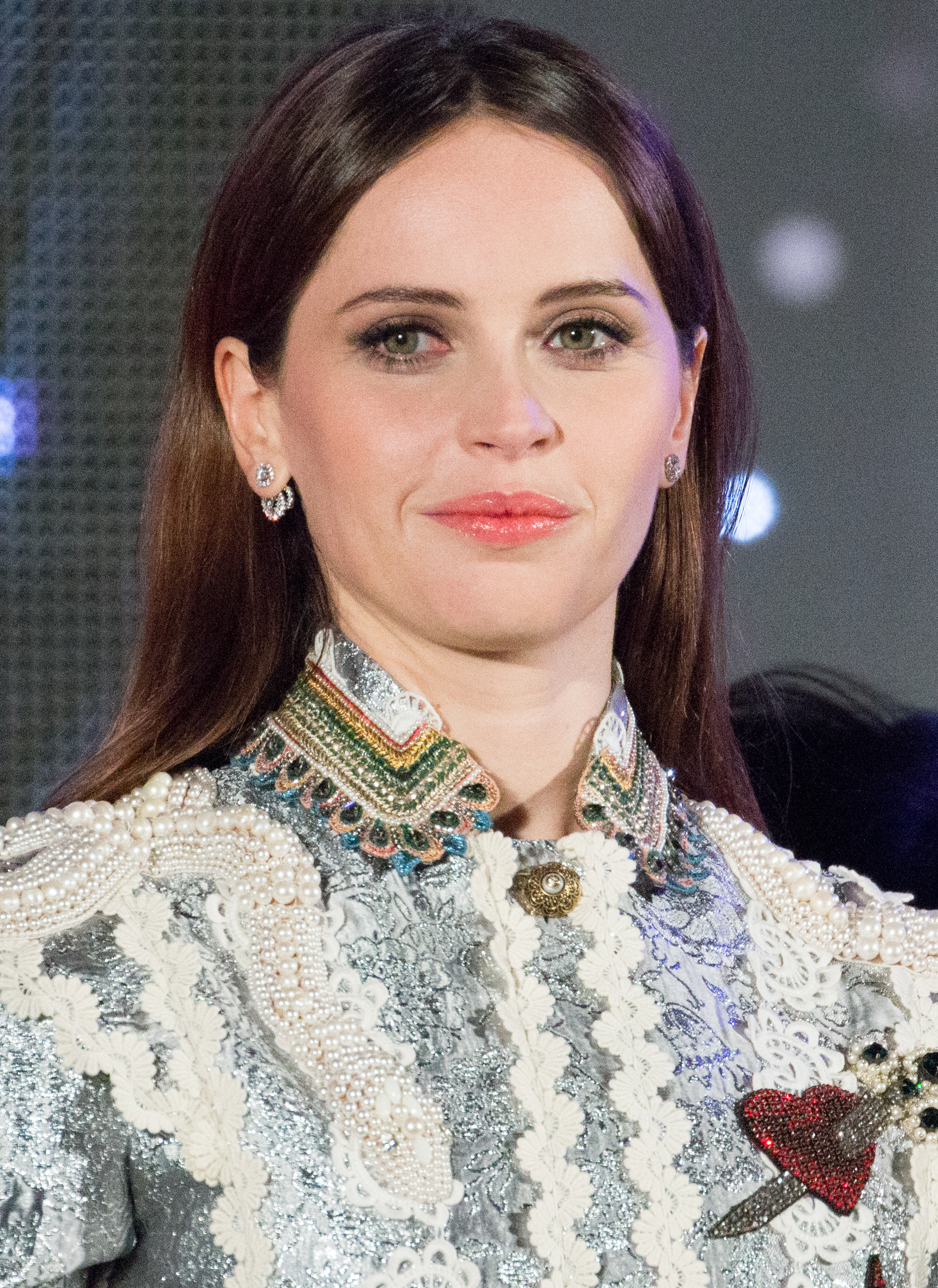
Felicity Jones, actress

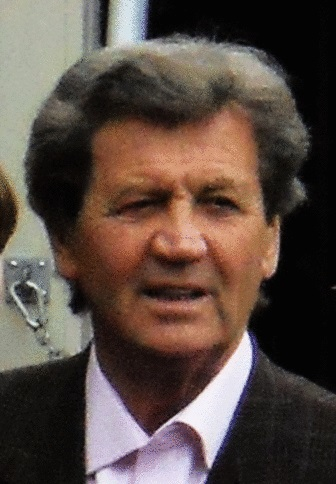
Melvyn Bragg, broadcaster and author

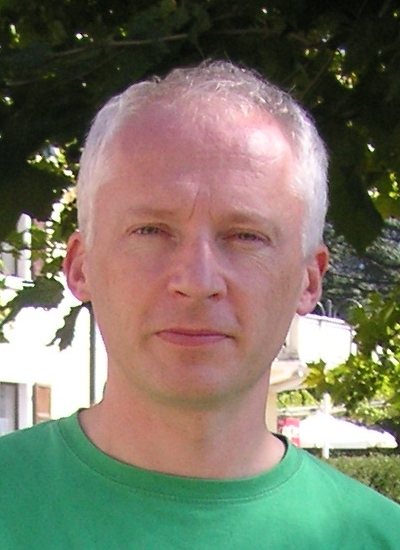
Marcus du Sautoy, mathematician and Simonyi Professor

== Sources ==
- Sherwood, Jennifer; Pevsner, Nikolaus (1975). Oxfordshire (3rd ed.). Penguin. ISBN 0140710450.
