= Robert Moray =

17th-century Scottish soldier, statesman, diplomat, judge, spy, and natural philosopher

Sir Robert Moray
- Born: 1608 or 1609 birthplace unknown (probably Craigie, Perthshire)
- Died: 1673; London
- Citizenship: Scotland
- Education: University of St Andrews (disputed) possibly a university in France
- Known for: persuaded Charles II to grant the Royal Society a royal charter
- Scientific career
- Fields: chemistry, magnetism, metallurgy, mineralogy, natural history, pharmacology, applied technology (fishing, lumbering, mining, shipbuilding, watermills, windmills)

Sir Robert Moray (alternative spellings: Murrey, Murray) FRS (1608 or 1609 – 4 July 1673) was a Scottish soldier, statesman, diplomat, judge, spy, and natural philosopher. He was well known to Charles I and Charles II, and to the French cardinals Armand Richelieu and Jules Mazarin. He attended the meeting of the 1660 committee of 12 on 28 November 1660 that led to the formation of the Royal Society, and was influential in gaining its Royal Charter and formulating its statutes and regulations. He was also one of the founders of modern Freemasonry in Great Britain.

== Early life and education ==
Moray was the elder of two sons of a Perthshire laird, Sir Mungo Moray of Craigie. His grandfather was Robert Moray of Abercairny (near Crieff), and his mother was a daughter of George Halket of Pitfirran, Dunfermline. An uncle, David Moray, had been a personal servant of Henry Frederick, Prince of Wales.

Some biographers have claimed that Moray attended the University of St Andrews and continued his university education in France. However, Moray himself wrote to his friend Alexander Bruce (who probably had attended St Andrews), jocularly proposing a debate between the two men, in which Moray said he would force Bruce to "rub up your St Andrews language", and "one may give you your hands full that was scarcely ever farrer East then Cowper" (Cupar lies several miles to the west of St Andrews). Moray's name does not appear in the matriculation records of the university.

In 1633, he joined the Garde Écossaise, a regiment which fought under Colonel John Hepburn in the army of King Louis XIII of France. Moray became a favourite of Cardinal Richelieu, who used him as a spy. Richelieu promoted Moray to Lieutenant Colonel and in 1638 sent him to join the Covenanter army in Edinburgh. Experienced in military engineering, he was appointed quartermaster-general in the Scottish Army that invaded England in 1640 in the Second Bishops' War and took Newcastle upon Tyne.

== Freemasonry ==
Freemasons who were part of the Scottish army and were also members of The Lodge of Edinburgh (now The Lodge of Edinburgh (Mary's Chapel), No.1) initiated him into Freemasonry there on 20 May 1641. Although initiated into a Scottish lodge, the event took place south of the border: this is earliest extant record of a man being initiated into speculative Freemasonry on English soil. Thereafter, he regularly used a five pointed star, his masonic mark, on his correspondence.

== Political career ==
Robert Moray returned to France by 1643 and was captured at Tuttlingen in November of that year. Upon his release, and upon the death of James Campbell, 1st Earl of Irvine, Moray took over command of the Garde Écossaise.

Moray helped to persuade the Prince of Wales, the future Charles II, to visit Scotland for his coronation as King of Scots at Scone on 1 January 1651. Charles then invaded England from Scotland, but was defeated at the Battle of Worcester in September 1651, and forced to escape to France.

In Scotland, Moray became Lord Justice Clerk, a Privy Councillor, and a Lord of Session in 1651. He married Sophia Lindsay, daughter of David Lindsay, 1st Lord Balcarres, but she died in childbirth on 2 January 1653 and the child was stillborn. Moray joined a Scottish uprising in 1653 which was suppressed by Cromwell, and Moray returned to the continent in 1654. Moray spent time in Bruges in 1656, then in Maastricht until 1659, when he joined Charles in Paris.

== Founding of the Royal Society ==
Following the restoration of Charles II, Moray was one of the founders of the Royal Society at its first formal meeting on Wednesday 28 November 1660, at the premises of Gresham College on Bishopsgate, at which Christopher Wren, Gresham Professor of Astronomy, delivered a lecture. The twelve in attendance were an interesting mix of four Royalists (William Brouncker, 2nd Viscount Brouncker, Alexander Bruce, 2nd Earl of Kincardine, Sir Paul Neile, William Balle) and six Parliamentarians (John Wilkins, Robert Boyle, Jonathan Goddard, William Petty, Lawrence Rook, Christopher Wren) and two others with less fixed (or more flexible) views, Abraham Hill and Moray. Moray was influential in gaining the new society its Royal Charter and formulating its statutes and regulations. Moray was the first President of the society which holds its Annual General Meeting on Saint Andrew's Day (30 November) the Patron Saint of Scotland in apparent acknowledgement of Moray's importance in the formation of the society.

=== Scientific research ===
Moray made significant contributions to the observation of tidal phenomena. Shortly before the restoration of Charles II, he stayed for several weeks in the remote island of Great Bernera, in the Outer Hebrides, and observed that the normal semidiurnal tide was there combined with tidal streams between the nearby islands that exhibited a strong diurnal motion. Moray reported these "extraordinary tydes" to the Royal Society in 1665, which published them in the first volume of the Philosophical Transactions. Nearly 200 years passed before Moray's description was confirmed by hydrographic measurements in the Sound of Harris. It was only in 1968 that the phenomenon was satisfactorily explained in terms of the theory of "continental shelf waves".

In 1666, Moray published Considerations and Enquiries concerning Tides. There he advocated careful quantitative observation of tidal phenomena and proposed, for the first time in the scientific literature, the use of stilling-wells as tide gauges.

== Later years ==
Moray became a Privy Councillor again in February 1661, and was later a Lord of the Exchequer. His younger brother, Sir William Moray, was Master of Works to Charles II. The King granted him an apartment at the Palace of Whitehall, where he engaged in chemical experiments. He became a recluse in later life, and, by the time of his death, he was virtually a pauper. He was buried in Westminster Abbey at the order of the King. His grave is unmarked, but his name appears on the stone of Abraham Cowley, near the ashes of Geoffrey Chaucer and Edmund Spenser, in Poets' Corner.

Moray had a range of notable friends: James Gregory, Samuel Pepys, Thomas Vaughan, Andrew Marvell, John Evelyn and Gilbert Burnet.

== Legacy ==
Moray's legacy is just beginning to be appreciated in the country of his birth. In 1969 a masonic lodge of research, Lodge Sir Robert Moray, No.1641, (Edinburgh, Scotland) was established in his honour.
