= Venterus Mandey =

English bricklayer and mathematician (1646–1702)

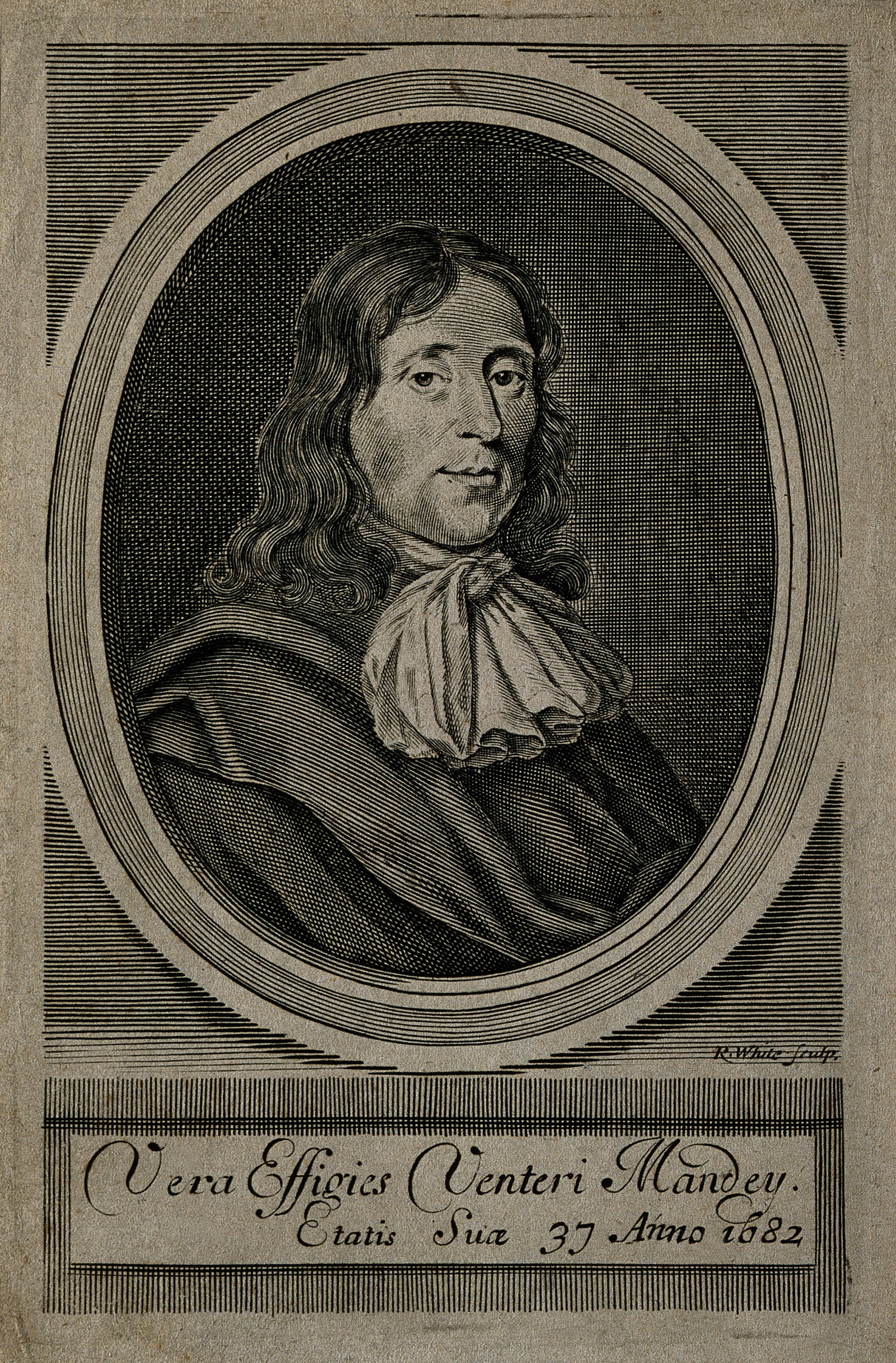
Line engraving by R, White (1702)

Venterus Mandey (1646–1702), also called Venturus Mandey and Venteri Mandey, was an English bricklayer and mathematician.

== Sources ==
- Smith, Terence Paul (February 2003). "Venturus Mandey: No Ordinary Bricklayer". Information, 90, Bricklaying Issue. British Brick Society. pp. 16–19.
