= Abraham Hill =

British merchant

Abraham Hill FRS (19 April 1633 in London – 5 February 1721) was a British merchant.

== Life ==
Hill was baptised on 16 June 1635 at St Dionis Backchurch, London. His father, Richard Hill, a merchant and Alderman of London, was appointed by the Long Parliament treasurer of sequestrations in the summer of 1642, and acted in that capacity until 1649. His mother, Agnes Trewolla, was the daughter of Thomas Trewolla of Mevagissey who hailed from the line from John Trewolla, Esquire, builder of the quay in Mevagissey, and Letitia Rashleigh Trewolla, both of Treleavan who herself was grandchild of the progenitor of the Rashleighs of Fowey.

Hill entered his father's business, in which he was successful, but also studied languages and philosophy. He was also a book and coin collector. On his father's death in January 1660 he inherited a fortune, and hired chambers in Gresham College. He was one of the Council of the Royal Society named in the king's charter, dated 22 April 1663. On 30 November of that year he was elected treasurer of the society, an office which he held until 30 November 1665. Re-elected on 1 December 1679, he discharged the duties again until 30 November 1700.

On the accession of William III and Mary II, Hill became a commissioner of trade, and when John Tillotson became archbishop of Canterbury in 1691 he appointed Hill his comptroller. In the next reign Hill resigned his seat at the board of trade, and retired to his estate of St. John's in Sutton-at-Hone, Kent, which he had purchased in 1665. He died on 5 February 1721, and was buried in the chancel of Sutton Church.

Hill was a friend and correspondent of John Evelyn and Samuel Pepys, and a kinsman of Abigail Hill, who became Lady Masham.

== Works ==
Hill wrote a life of Isaac Barrow for the first volume of his Works, published in 1683, and reissued in subsequent editions. A selection from Hill's correspondence was edited by Thomas Astle as Familiar Letters which passed between A. Hill and several eminent and ingenious persons of the last century, London, 1767. The manuscript of this correspondence, together with other papers of Hill and his father, is preserved among the Additional Manuscripts in the British Museum, where are also ten volumes of Hill's commonplace books, his official memoranda as commissioner of trade, and his letters to Sir Hans Sloane, 1697–1720.

== Family ==
He married first, Anne (died 1661), daughter of Sir Bulstrode Whitelocke, by whom he had a son, Richard (1660–1721), and a daughter, Frances (1658–1736). His second wife was Elizabeth (1644–1672), daughter of Michael Pratt of Bromley-by-Bow, Middlesex.
