= Lawrence Rooke =

British astronomer and mathematician

Lawrence Rooke (also Laurence) (1622–26 June 1662) was an English astronomer and mathematician. He was also one of the founders of the Royal Society, although he died as it was being formally constituted.

== Life ==
He was born in Deptford, and was a great-nephew through his mother of Lancelot Andrewes.

He was educated at Eton College and King's College, Cambridge, where he graduated M.A. in 1647. He became a fellow commoner at Wadham College, Oxford in 1650, having dropped out of academia for a period because of bad health. At Wadham he worked closely with John Wilkins and Seth Ward.

He became Professor of Astronomy at Gresham College in 1652, and then Professor of Geometry there, in 1657, an appointment in which Oliver Cromwell took an interest.

He was unpublished in his lifetime, but left papers on longitude and the moons of Jupiter that were published posthumously. He also wrote at the Royal Society's request a set of directions for sailors, on the correct way to record meteorological and oceanographic observations on their travels. These appeared in volume 1 of the Royal Society's Philosophical Transactions as Directions for Sea-men, bound for far Voyages (Phil. Trans. 1665 1 140–143) doi:10.1098/rstl.1665.0066.

Montes Rook, a circular mountain range on the moon, is named after Lawrence Rooke.
