= Reading room =

Reading room may refer to reference library or:

- Newport Reading Room, also known as The Reading Room, a gentleman's club in Newport, Rhode Island
- Reading Room (painting), a 2022 painting by Danielle Mckinney
- The Reading Room (film), a 2005 American television film
- The Reading Room (Hasenclever), an 1843 painting by Johann Peter Hasenclever

== See also ==
- Christian Science Reading Room
- Mrs Peppercorn's Magical Reading Room
- Sheikh Abdullah § Reading Room Party
- Study (room)
- The Queen's Reading Room
- Treeton Reading Room F.C.
