= List of score series and pocket-score series =

This is a list of score series and pocket-score series issued by music publishers. The focus is on pocket score series and Studienpartituren (study scores). These series consist of systematically published collections of full scores—often in reduced or portable formats—intended primarily for study, analysis, and reference.

Voluminous series are for example the Eulenburg Miniature Scores, founded in the late 19th century, and Hawkes Pocket Scores, published by Boosey & Hawkes, particularly associated with modern and contemporary music of the 20th century.

The vast majority of old editions are now in the public domain; cf. International Music Score Library Project (IMSLP).

== List ==
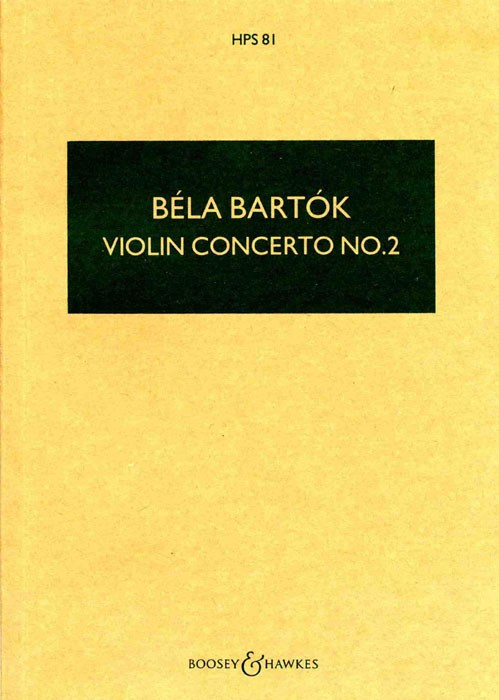
Béla Bartók: Violin Concerto No. 2 (Hawkes Pocket Scores (HPS) 81)

- Bärenreiter-Taschenpartituren, published by Bärenreiter, reflecting the publisher's urtext tradition.
- Donajowski's Miniature Scores, published in London in the late 19th century; the catalogue was later incorporated into the Edition Eulenburg series.
- Dover Miniature Scores, issued by Dover Publications, consisting primarily of reprints of public-domain works in miniature format.
- Edition Eulenburg (Eulenburg Miniature Scores), founded in the 19th century, encompassing orchestral, chamber, and operatic repertoire.
- Hawkes Pocket Scores (HPS), published by Boosey & Hawkes, particularly associated with modern and contemporary music of the 20th century.
- Henle Verlag Studienpartituren, published by G. Henle Verlag, generally based on urtext editions and scholarly editorial principles.
- Kalmus Miniature Scores, first issued by Edwin F. Kalmus.
- Payne's kleine Partitur-Ausgabe, A. Payne's Musikverlag, later partly absorbed by other publishers.
- Philharmonia Partituren (Philharmonia Pocket Scores), by the Wiener Philharmonischer Verlag, founded in 1923 by Alfred Kalmus (1889–1972).
