= Carlo Dolci =

Italian painter (1616–1686)

- Self-Portrait (1674), oil on canvas, 74,5 × 60,5 cm, Florence, Uffizi
- Born: May 25, 1616; Florence, Grand Duchy of Tuscany
- Died: January 17, 1686 (aged 69); Florence, Grand Duchy of Tuscany
- Resting place: Santissima Annunziata, Florence
- Education: Jacopo Vignali
- Known for: Painting
- Movement: Baroque
- Spouse: Teresa Bucherelli (m. 1654)
- Children: Agnese Dolci

Carlo (or Carlino) Dolci (25 May 1616 – 17 January 1686) was an Italian Baroque painter active mainly in Florence, known for highly finished religious pictures, often repeated in many versions.

== Biography ==
=== Early career ===
Carlo Dolci was born in Florence on 25 May 1616, to Andrea Dolci, a tailor, and his wife, Agnese Marinari. He was precocious and apprenticed at a young age to Jacopo Vignali, and when only eleven years of age he attempted a whole figure of St John, and a head of the infant Christ, which received some approbation. Dolci’s natural inclination to paint intense and subjective religious work was nurtured by contact with Vignali’s visceral and emotive approach during the later 1620s. He was also aware of the strong contemporary tendency to favour simple, direct narrative, as seen in the work of Matteo Rosselli, Francesco Curradi and others. His love of detail in lavish textiles, jewellery and the human face and hands rendered with obsessive (but never finicking) attention to texture set him apart from contemporary Florentine painters.

Dolci was not prolific; "He would take weeks over a single foot", according to his biographer Filippo Baldinucci. In 1682, when he saw Giordano – nicknamed "fa presto" (quick worker) – paint more in five hours than he could have completed in months, he fell into a depression. His painstaking technique made him unsuited for large-scale fresco painting. He painted chiefly sacred subjects, and his works are generally small in scale, although he made a few life-size pictures. He often repeated the same composition in several versions, and his daughter, Agnese Dolci, also made copies of his works.

In 1631 Dolci painted a bust-length portrait of Stefano della Bella (Florence, Palazzo Pitti). It is likely that he knew and copied Early Netherlandish painting in addition to more recent Flemish work, and the portrait of Fra Ainolfo de' Bardi (1632; Florence, Palazzo Pitti), completed when he was only sixteen, shows that he had studied Flemish art as much for style as technique. This picture already reveals Dolci’s genius for portraiture, and his precocity, which ensured his immediate success in discriminating Florentine circles. The census of Florence of 1632 reveals that in that year he was described as ‘painter’; he was probably supporting the household in which he was the only male, his father having died in 1620. Baldinucci named his first patrons as Piero de’ Medici, the Duc de Guise, the musician Antonio Landini and Cardinal Leopoldo de' Medici.

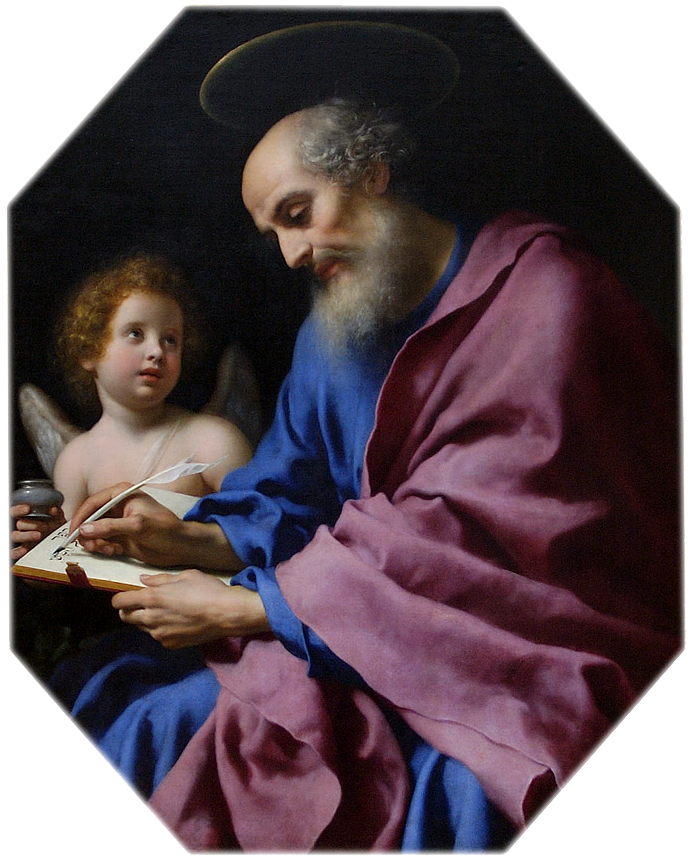
St. Matthew Writing His Gospel (1630s), oil on canvas, 133.7 × 113.7 cm, Malibu, CA, J. Paul Getty Museum

Dolci maintained this level of success throughout his life. His small Adoration of the Kings (Blenheim Palace, Oxfordshire) may be the version painted for Cardinal Leopoldo and reveals Dolci’s synthesis of elements from contemporary figure compositions and his youthful passion for brilliant colour. The major works almost certainly of the 1630s are the three known pictures of evangelists (Los Angeles, CA, priv. col.; Italy, priv. col.; Malibu, CA, J. Paul Getty Museum) possibly from the set that Dolci painted for Giovanbattista Galli. The work in Malibu, St. Matthew Writing His Gospel, features a child model identical with that in another early picture, the Guardian Angel (Budapest, Museum of Fine Arts). In these works Dolci combines a perfection of surface finish, probably influenced by Bronzino’s, with quasi-Caravaggesque chiaroscuro and modelling and, in St. Matthew, the softness of Antonio da Correggio. The paintings’ refined sensibility, tactile surfaces and obviously portrait heads are features of his subsequent work.

Baldinucci listed few pictures of the earliest period, passing rapidly to the 1640s. It seems reasonable to assume that the Virgin of the Lilies (1642; Montpellier, Musée Fabre) is at the core of a group that includes the Budapest Guardian Angel, the Marriage of the Virgin (priv. col.) and possibly the intensely moving funerary portrait of Serafina Pezzuoli (San Gaetano, Florence). These would thus be datable between the later 1630s and about 1643, the date of St. Andrew Praying before Martyrdom (Birmingham Museum and Art Gallery), which shows a greater degree of realism and less sweetness than its predecessors. The last of the type personified by the Montpellier picture is the Allegory of Poetry (Florence, Palazzo Corsini) from the end of the decade, which is also the best example of the blurred dividing line for Dolci between portraiture, religious and allegorical themes.

During the 1640s Dolci increasingly absorbed Florentine art of the 15th and 16th centuries, and probably worked more intensively as a copyist. Archival evidence shows that he copied the work of Antonio da Correggio, among others; the latter’s Virgin Adoring the Infant Christ (Florence, Uffizi) arrived in Florence in 1617 and was of fundamental importance for the evolution of Dolci’s style. His St. Andrew Praying before his Crucifixion is filled with quotations from works by other masters, including Titian’s Youth with a Fur Collar (New York, Frick Collection), after which Dolci appears to have made a drawing. In 1645 he produced a homage to Michelangelo in the form of copies (Florence, Uffizi; Paris, Louvre) made of the latter’s portrait of Andrea Quaratesi (London, British Museum). Dolci’s ability as a sophisticated pasticheur of 15th-century art is best seen in his small tondo of St. Ursula (Kedleston Hall, Derbyshire) of c. 1640. He may also have repainted the head of Christ in Domenico Ghirlandaio’s Last Supper (Ognissanti, Florence). This tendency belongs to a contemporary revival of 15th-century style in much Florentine painting. In 1648 Dolci selected Fra Angelico as the subject of his presentation painting for the Accademia delle Arti del Disegno.

Dolci was never adept at evolving complex figure compositions, for which he depended on other artists, and in 1647 he painted the Penitent St. Jerome ( 1647; New York, R. Feigen priv. col.), based on a larger painting by Cigoli ( 1603; priv. col.). The Penitent St. Jerome, Flight into Egypt (Burghley House, Lincolnshire) and the Guardian Angel (Corsham Court, Corsham, England) are among a group of small-scale, small-figure pictures, mainly of the 1640s, which all show loose brushwork and a childlike simplicity of expression and gesture. Baldinucci noted Dolci’s genius for painting ‘little figures … in which he displayed a unique manner … mainly on copper and canvas’. Dolci’s talent as a portrait miniaturist is best seen in his tiny likeness of Baldinucci (1645; Florence, Uffizi) and in his many exceptionally refined chalk portraits. Christ in the House of the Pharisee (1649; Corsham Court, Corsham, England) forms a fitting culmination to the decade and achieves a grandeur unusual for Dolci. Here again the composition is based on a work by Cigoli (1596; Rome, Galleria Doria Pamphilj), which was known to Dolci through a print by Cornelis Galle the Elder. The modello (Stockholm, Nationalmuseum) for this work survives, as do those for others. However, the Vision of St. John on Patmos (Florence, Palazzo Pitti), although connected with a lost canvas painted for the Rinuccini family, does not appear to be a modello.

=== Mature and late work ===
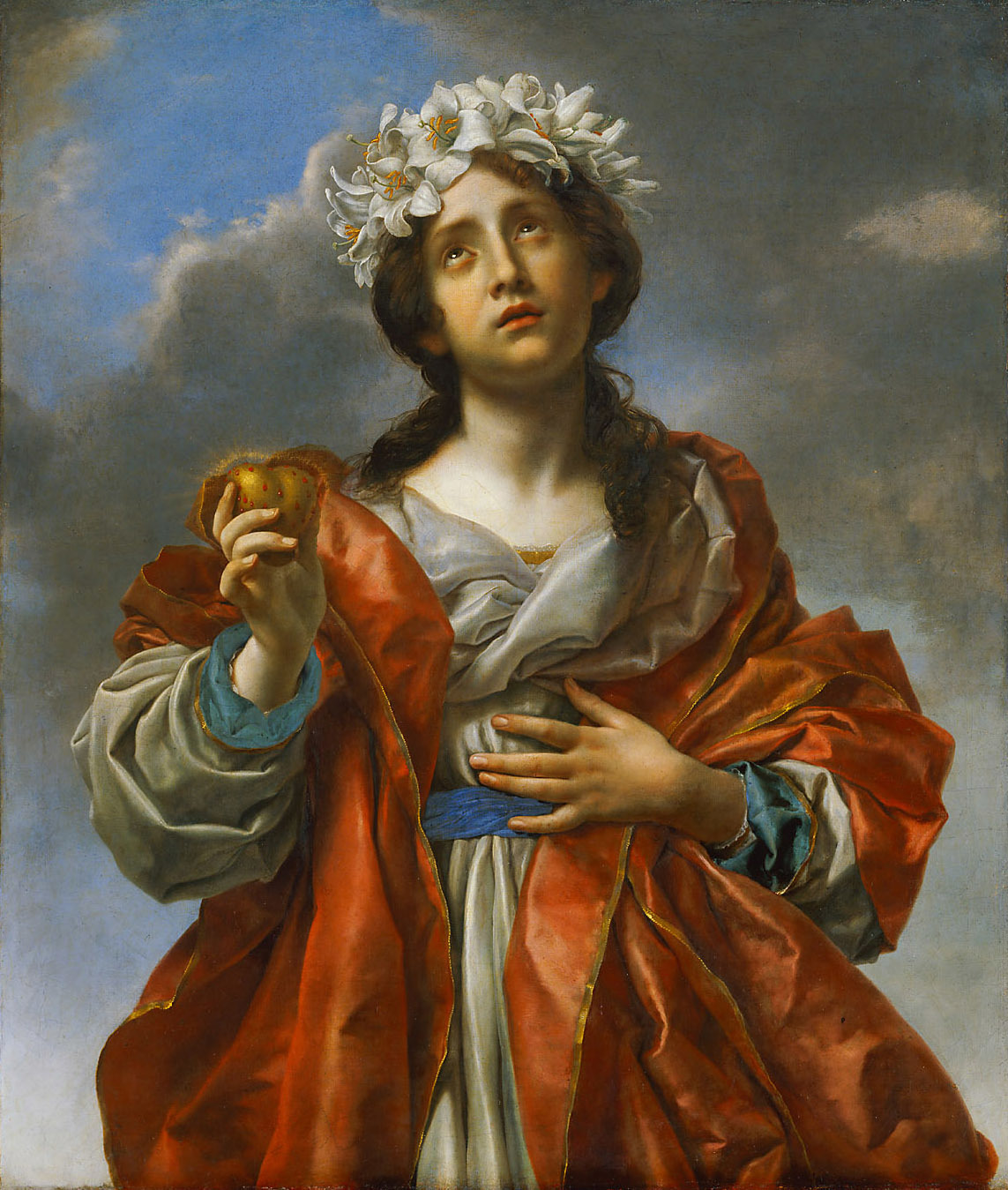
Allegory of Sincerity (c. 1665), oil on canvas, 102 x 87 cm, Vienna, Kunsthistorisches Museum

Dolci was known for his profound religious piety. According to Baldinucci, he painted a half-figure of Christ wearing the Crown of Thorns every year during Passion Week. In the 1650s and early 1660s he created a series of aggressively didactic works, exemplifying his ‘firm intention to paint only works which would inspire the fruits of Christian piety in those who saw them’ (Baldinucci) and establishing a style that was to prevail throughout his career. This is the official Dolci, and the contrast with the smaller, more private works of the 1640s could not be greater. The half-length, single-figure paintings, an Allegory of Sincerity (Vienna, Kunsthistorisches Museum) and Charity (1657; Prato, Cassa di Risparmio), and the Infant Christ with a Garland of Flowers (Lugano, Col. Thyssen-Bornemisza) reveal a certain tendency towards simplification of the picture format. A new Baroque fullness first appears in the study (Paris, Louvre) for the Penitent Mary Magdalene (Academy of Fine Arts of Parma) and is developed in the amply draped figures of the Allegory of Sincerity and Charity, and, with increasing refinement, in the St. Margaret (begun 1664; Florence, Palazzo Pitti).

These half-length single figures are remarkably different from his rare, larger compositions. In 1656 he painted the Presentation of the Miraculous Image at Soriano for Sant'Andrea Apostolo a Cennano at Montevarchi, the deliberate destruction of which has been a great loss for the study of his work, as it provided, together with the Vision of St. Louis of Toulouse (1676–81; Florence, Palazzo Pitti), the only means of assessing his own, large-scale compositional inventions. The lost composition is known from photographs and fragments, notably the particularly beautiful crowned head of the Virgin. Other figures in the Presentation reflect his interest in the use of rich drapery, which is especially evident in works of this period. The work is an example of the Baroque concept of metapainting ('a painting about painting'). The Virgin holds a miraculous and iconic painting of St. Dominic, and this sacred artwork becomes the central subject of the canvas itself.

Portrait of Sir Thomas Baines (1665–1670), oil on canvas, 86.2 x 72.4 cm, Cambridge, Fitzwilliam Museum

In 1662 Dolci painted a Vase of Flowers (Florence, Uffizi) for Giancarlo de' Medici, under the influence of contemporary Dutch painting, particularly Willem van Aelst, who served as court painter to Ferdinando II de' Medici from 1649 to 1657. Baldinucci noted that Dolci excelled as a still-life painter, but no other examples of this kind are known. He painted a pair of portraits, Sir Thomas Baines and Sir John Finch (both Cambridge, Fitzwilliam Museum), between 1665 and 1670, when Finch (1626–82) was English Resident at the court of Grand Duke Ferdinando II. Sir Thomas Baines is the more impressive of the two and presents the scholarly sitter, surrounded by the works of Classical writers, with a sober objectivity. In 1672 Dolci travelled to Innsbruck to paint the Archduchess Claudia de' Medici, widow of Archduke Leopold V and daughter of Ferdinando I. The result, Claudia Felice as Galla Placidia (1675; Florence, Palazzo Pitti), is the most remarkable of his likenesses, apart from the precocious Fra Ainolfo de’ Bardi. Perfectly sidestepping the problem of the state portrait with a didactic intent, he successfully combined the cerebral and the sensuous (a unique achievement in 17th-century Florence). It is also the best example of his ability to render every surface texture arrestingly tangible, a quality also particularly evident in the head of the Virgin from the dismembered Montevarchi altarpiece.

In more intimate portraiture, notably the many chalk studies of his wife and children, the degree of informality and incisiveness is startling; the best example is the drawing of Dolci’s wife in the Institut Néerlandais, Paris (other examples: London, British Museum; Florence, Uffizi; Paris, Louvre; Chatsworth House, Derbyshire). Dating to the final years of the artist's life is the chalk portrait of Dolci's youngest daughter, Agata (New York, Metropolitan Museum of Art), a melancholic and profoundly realistic work probably made in preparation for an unrealized painting. This unvarnished naturalism is rarely apparent in the painted portraits, with one striking exception, an Allegory of Caterina degli Scolari as Peace (Cowper priv. col.). Exactly how subtle Dolci’s portraiture was in comparison with that of his Florentine contemporaries is most evident in his Self-portrait (1674; Florence, Uffizi). Here Dolci is shown melancholy and elegantly clad, and the painting also includes a self-portrait drawing that shows him bespectacled and in working clothes, obsessively drawing, thus creating a unique play on the contemplative versus the creative process.

Allegory of Patience (1677), oil on canvas, 71 x 54 cm, Hanbury priv. col.

In the mid-1670s Dolci became severely depressed (Baldinucci), although little stylistic change is apparent during the following years and several of his principal pictures date from this final decade. The Guardian Angel (Prato Cathedral Museum), installed in Prato Cathedral in 1675, continues his revivalist experiments, though it recalls Mannerist more than 15th-century art, and includes a superb still-life of flowers. The Vision of St. Louis of Toulouse (1676–81; Florence, Palazzo Pitti) contains some of Dolci’s most beautiful painted passages, in spite of a certain compositional awkwardness. His Allegory of Patience, probably commissioned from the artist by Sir John Finch (1677; Hanbury priv. col.), is one of his most seductive images, with a suaveness redolent of French 18th-century art. In 1680 he created his celebrated Salome, the culmination of his richly clad three-quarter-length figures. The painting is lost and is now known only through fine versions, for example one in the Kelvingrove Art Gallery and Museum, probably by his pupil Onorio Marinari. Baldinucci stated that it was painted for the Marchese Pier Francesco Rinuccini, and that ‘it had as great a success at Florence as almost any of his works’. The picture was last seen at the Demidov sale of 1870. The picture’s pendant, also for the Rinuccini family, is David with the Head of Goliath (1680; Matthiesen Gallery, London).

The Christ Consecrating the Elements of the Mass (1680; Corsham Court, Wiltshire; Dresden, Gemäldegalerie Alte Meister), a strikingly simple presentation of a single figure, emphasizes the consistency of Dolci’s handling of this theme since the late 1650s. Baldinucci dated the artist’s final psychological decline to Luca Giordano’s arrival in Florence in 1682, and the ill-fated encounter between the two diametrically opposed talents.

Dolci dated two versions of Ecce homo in 1681 (Florence, Palazzo Corsini). In addition to bearing the pious inscriptions frequently found on the backs of his paintings, these are apparently his latest dated works. Baldinucci listed ‘many pictures entirely finished by his hand, and others not completed…’. Their completion and the question of studio participation in the production of countless copies and versions occasioned by the immense popularity of his work remain largely unstudied. Francesco Saverio Baldinucci in his Vite, writing on the painter Onorio Marinari, declares that Marinari was ‘also a very able imitator, above all of the delicate manner of Carlo Dolci’, while Bartolomeo Bimbi spent much time making copies after Dolci on commission. Baldinucci listed among Dolci’s pupils Alessandro Loni (1655–1702), whose signed Virgin at the Sepulchre (Florence, priv. col.) reveals him as one of the few painters capable of perpetuating Dolci’s pietistic imagery without mere plagiarism and in keeping with the trends of the Late Baroque and even the dawn of the Rococo style. Dolci's daughter, Agnese (died circa 1680), was also a well-known painter and often collaborated with his father. Two of her paintings, Jesus took bread and blessed it and Maria and Child, were included in the 1905 book Women Painters of the World. Her Consecration of the Bread and Wine (c. 1655) is in the Louvre. Dolci died in Florence in 1686. He was buried in his family tomb in the Basilica of the Santissima Annunziata, Florence.

== Posthumous fame and assessment ==
Saint Cecilia. Engraving by Albert Henry Payne after Carlo Dolci, Staatliche Kunstsammlungen Dresden

Dolci’s works were highly prized by the English aristocracy as early as the 17th century, when many of his finest pictures were already in British collections. Sir John Finch created the first important collection of Dolci’s works in Britain, which was dispersed in 1947. Lady Elizabeth Anson, commissioned Thomas Hudson a portrait of her holding a drawing of Dante Alighieri by Dolci (Shugborough Hall, National Trust). In 1836 Johann David Passavant called Dolci ‘that favourite of the English’ but, ironically, it was English writers, such as Robert Browning and John Ruskin, who first snidely attacked his reputation, which remained low until the 1960s. Throughout this period of unpopularity critics despised his piety and obsessive finish, the very qualities for which he had earlier been admired. His reputation was also damaged by the many copies of his work, the first of which emerged during his own career, and the comparative rarity of original works. Since the 1960s, as 17th-century Italian art has been restored to favour, both the complexity and the quality of Dolci’s art have been revalued.

The grand manner, vigorous coloration or luminosity, and dynamic emotion of the Bolognese-Roman Baroque are foreign to Dolci and to Baroque Florence. While he fits into a long tradition of prestigious official Florentine painting, Dolci appears constitutionally blind to the new aesthetic, shackled by the Florentine tradition that holds each drawn figure under a microscope of academicism. Wittkower describes him as the Florentine counterpart, in terms of devotional imagery, of the Roman Sassoferrato. Pilkington declared his touch "inexpressibly neat ... though he has often been censured for the excessive labour bestowed on his pictures, and for giving his carnations more of the appearance of ivory than the look of flesh", a flaw that had been already apparent in Agnolo Bronzino.

Dolci’s style is full of conflict, but this is often not immediately evident on account of the immaculate finish of his best work. His obsessiveness derives from the anguish inherent in what Matteo Marangoni called ‘his nostalgic vision of a world of perfection’. His figures, in spite of their ostensibly arresting tangibility, have an other-worldliness often emphasized by their airless, undefined settings and (where these survive) the infinite glazes of which he was master. His ideal of beauty was also intensely personal; it is as remote from Bolognese classicism as from Caravaggesque realism. A delicate melancholy pervades much of his work, whether religious paintings, such as the celebrated St. Cecilia (c. 1671; Dresden, Gemäldegalgalerie Alte Meister) or portraits, such as Claudia Felice as Galla Placidia or Sir Thomas Baines.

== Gallery ==
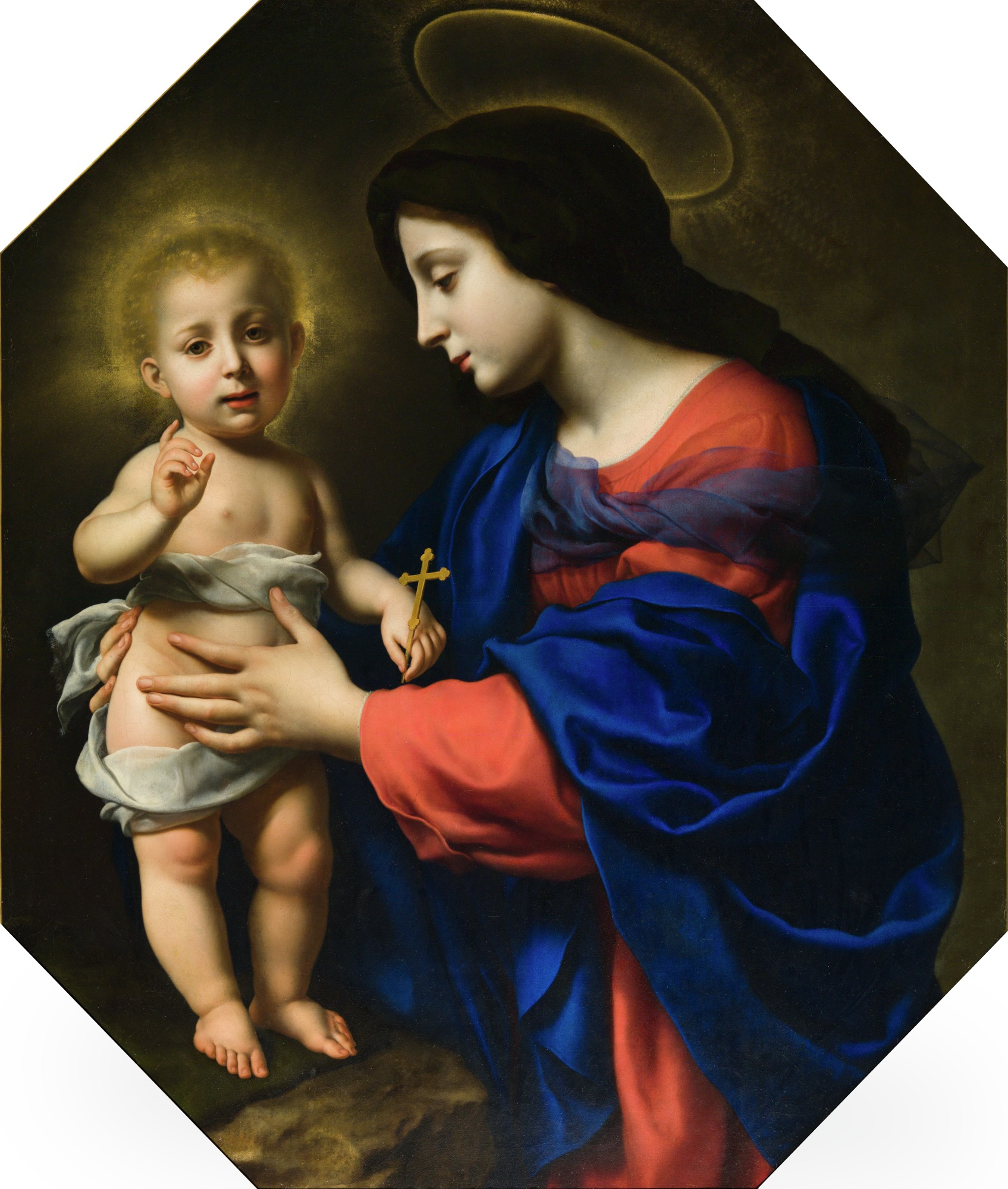
Madonna and Child (1651), oil on canvas, 90.8 × 77.4 cm, Detroit Institute of Arts

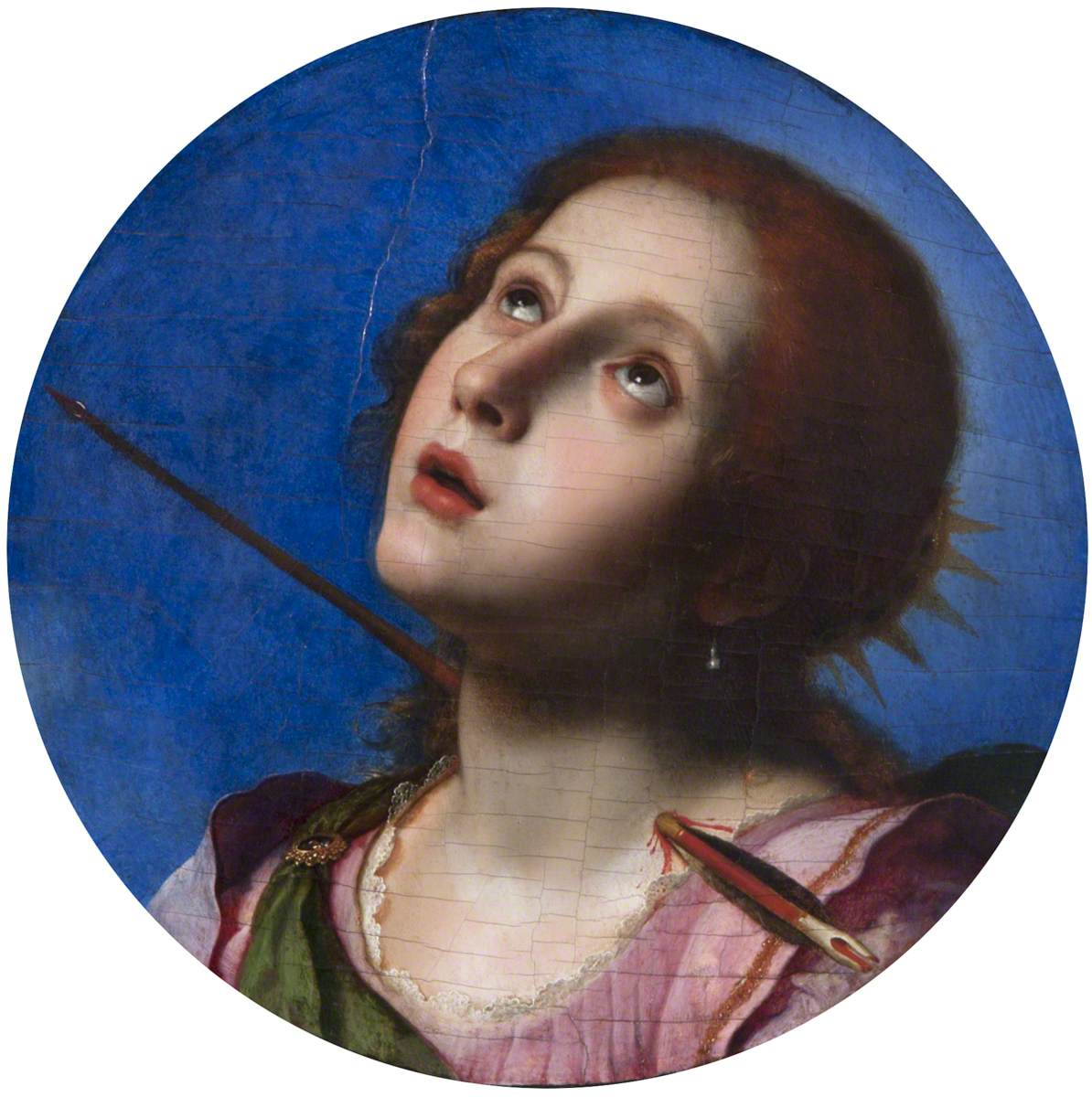
St. Christina of Bolsena (c. 1655), oil on canvas, 28.6 x 28.6 cm, Kedleston Hall

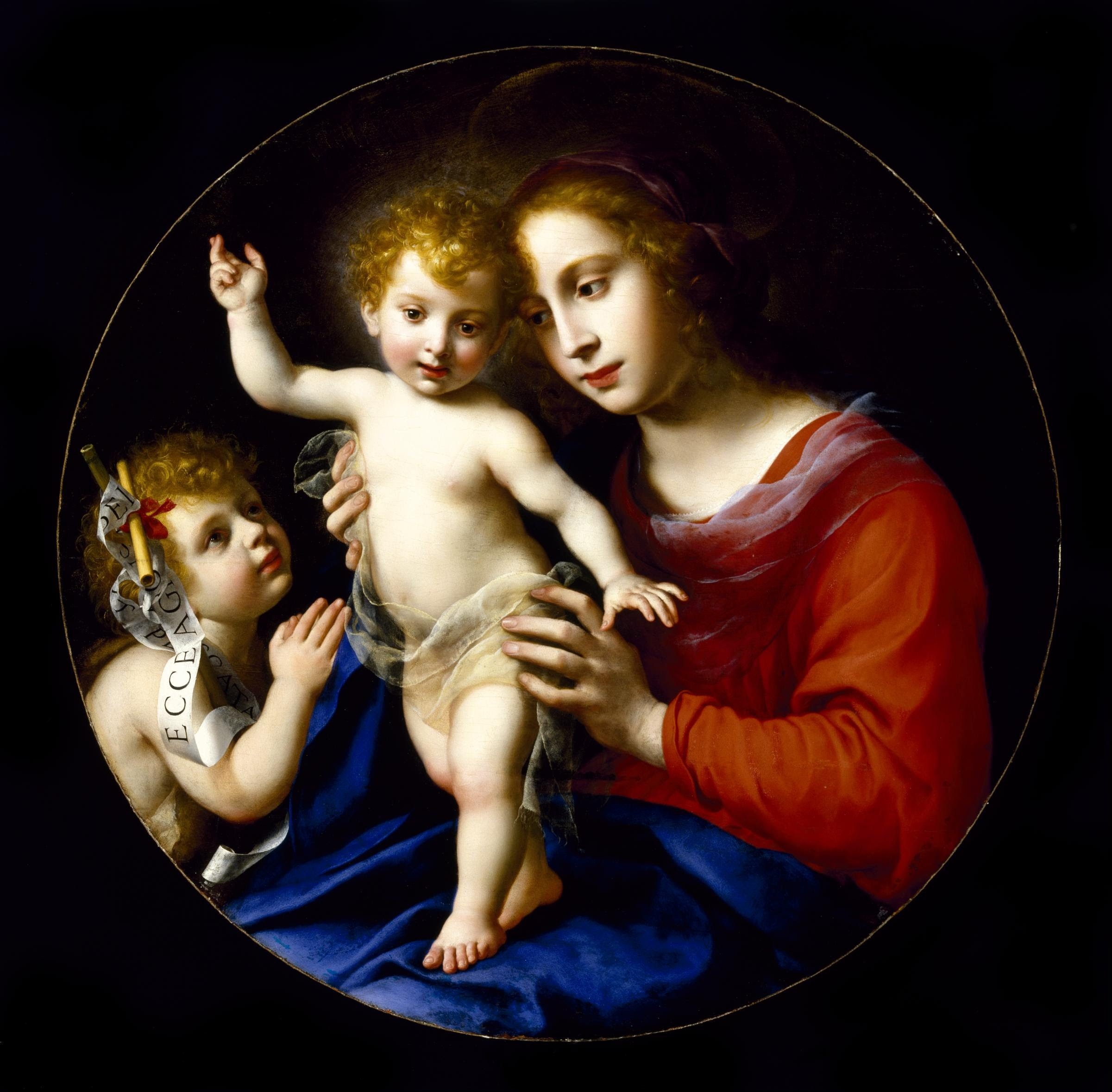
Virgin and Child with the Infant Saint John the Baptist (1635–1638), oil on canvas, 79.1 x 79.1 cm, Museum of Fine Arts, Houston

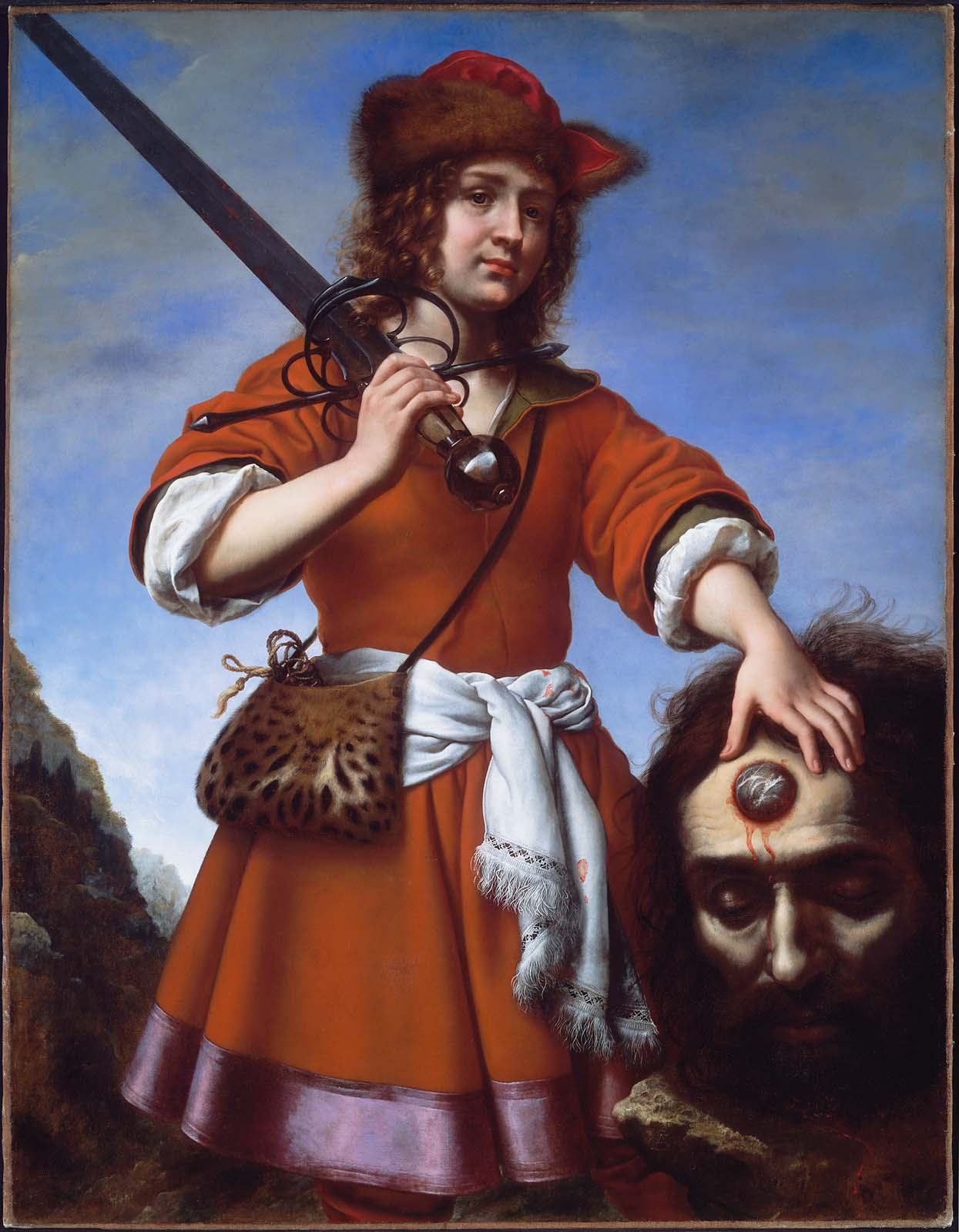
David with Head of Goliath (1680), oil on canvas, 131.5 x 106 cm, Museum of Fine Arts, Boston

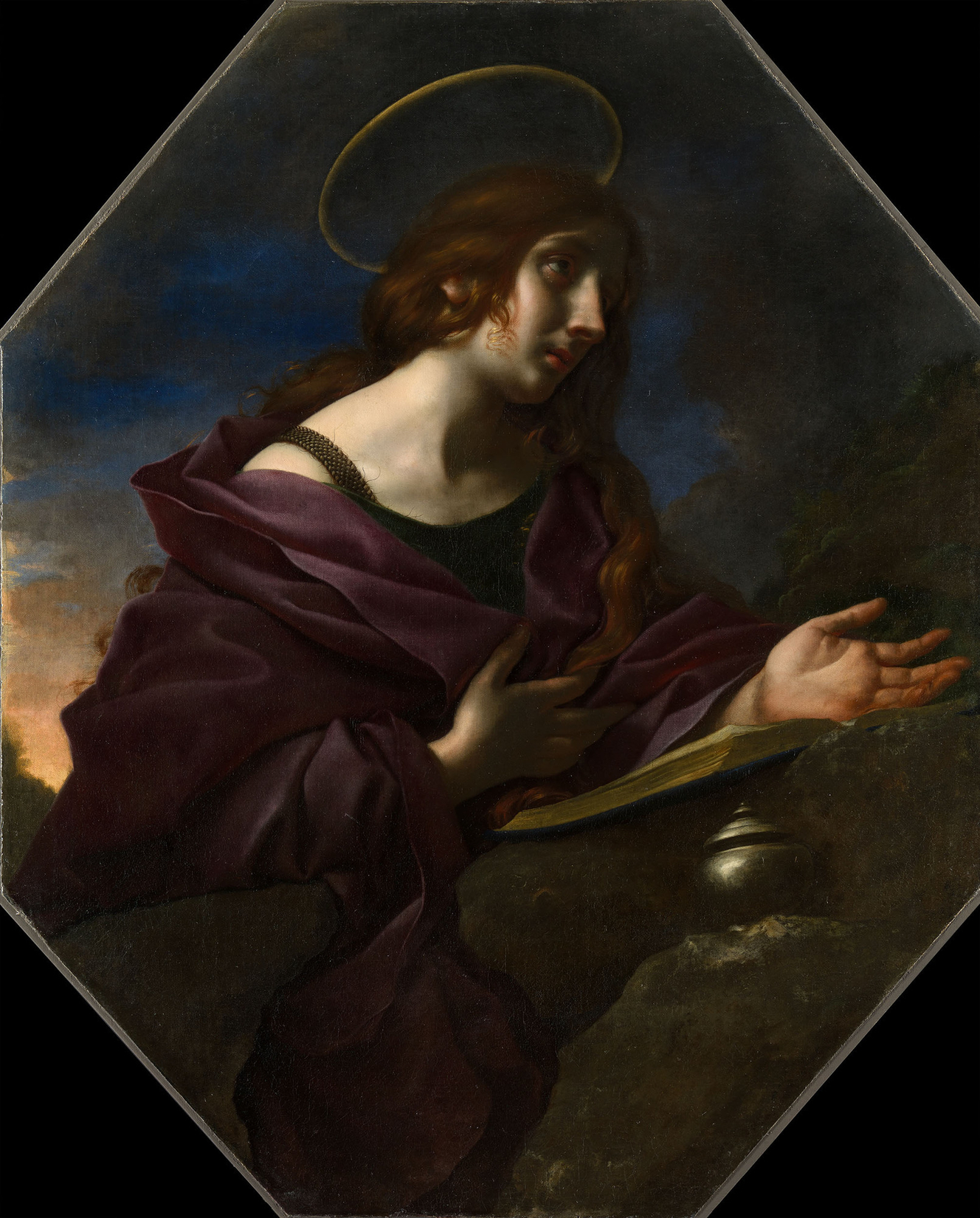
The Penitent Magdalen (1670), oil on canvas, 116.5 x 95.3 cm, Royal Collection

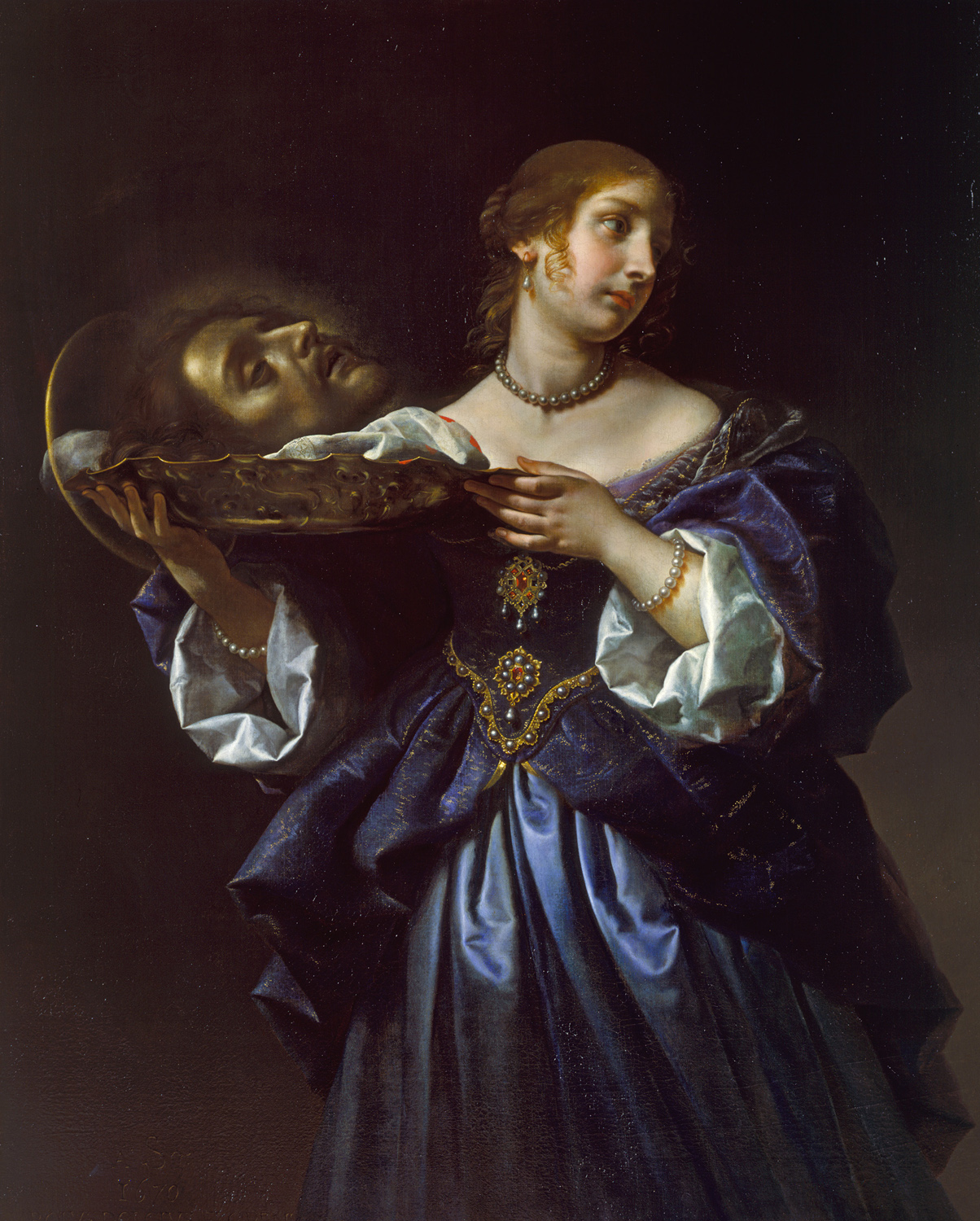
Salome and Head of St. John the Baptist (1665–1670), oil on canvas, 122.6 x 96.5 cm, Windsor Castle

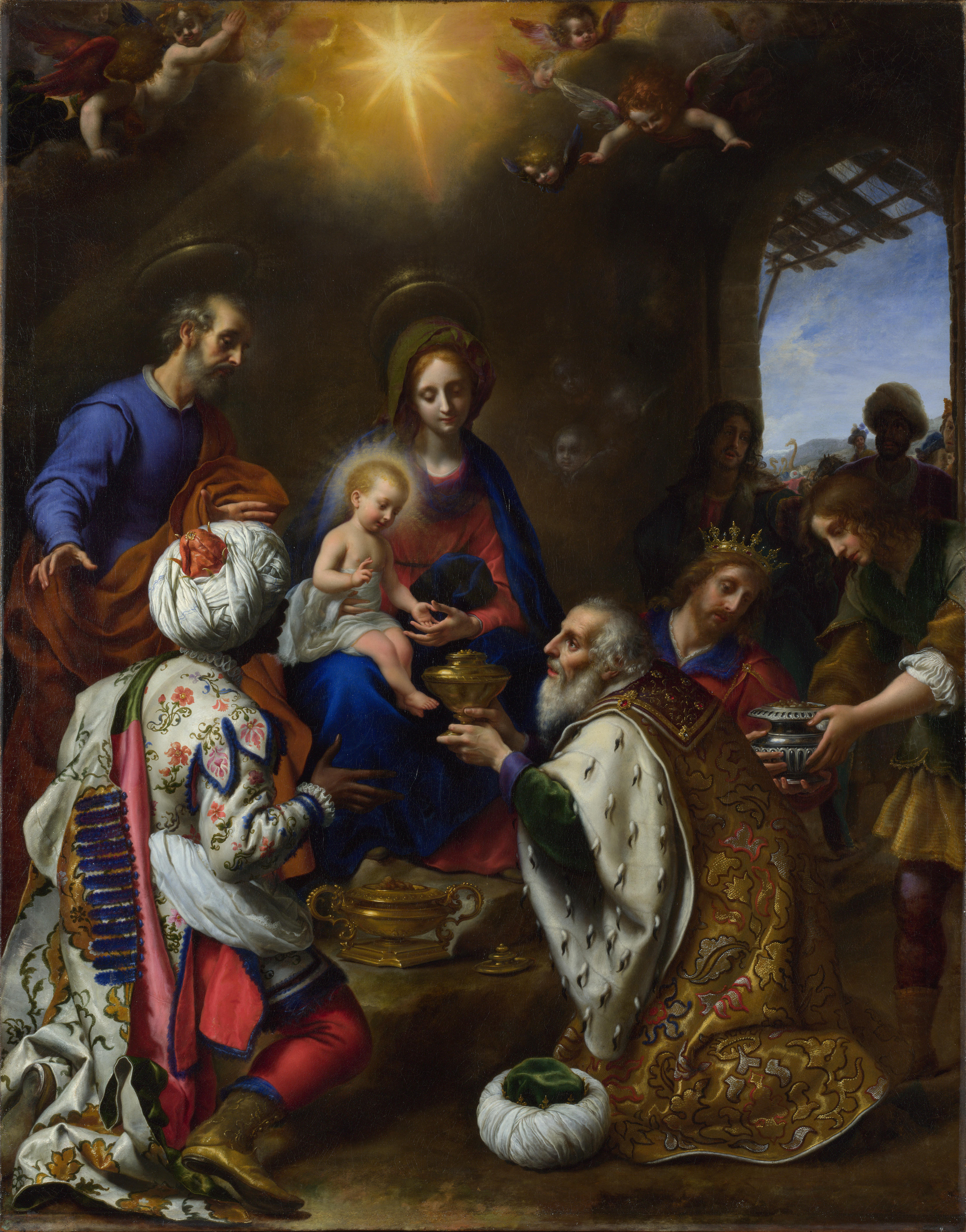
The Adoration of the Kings (1649), oil on canvas, 117 x 92 cm, National Gallery, Washington, D.C.

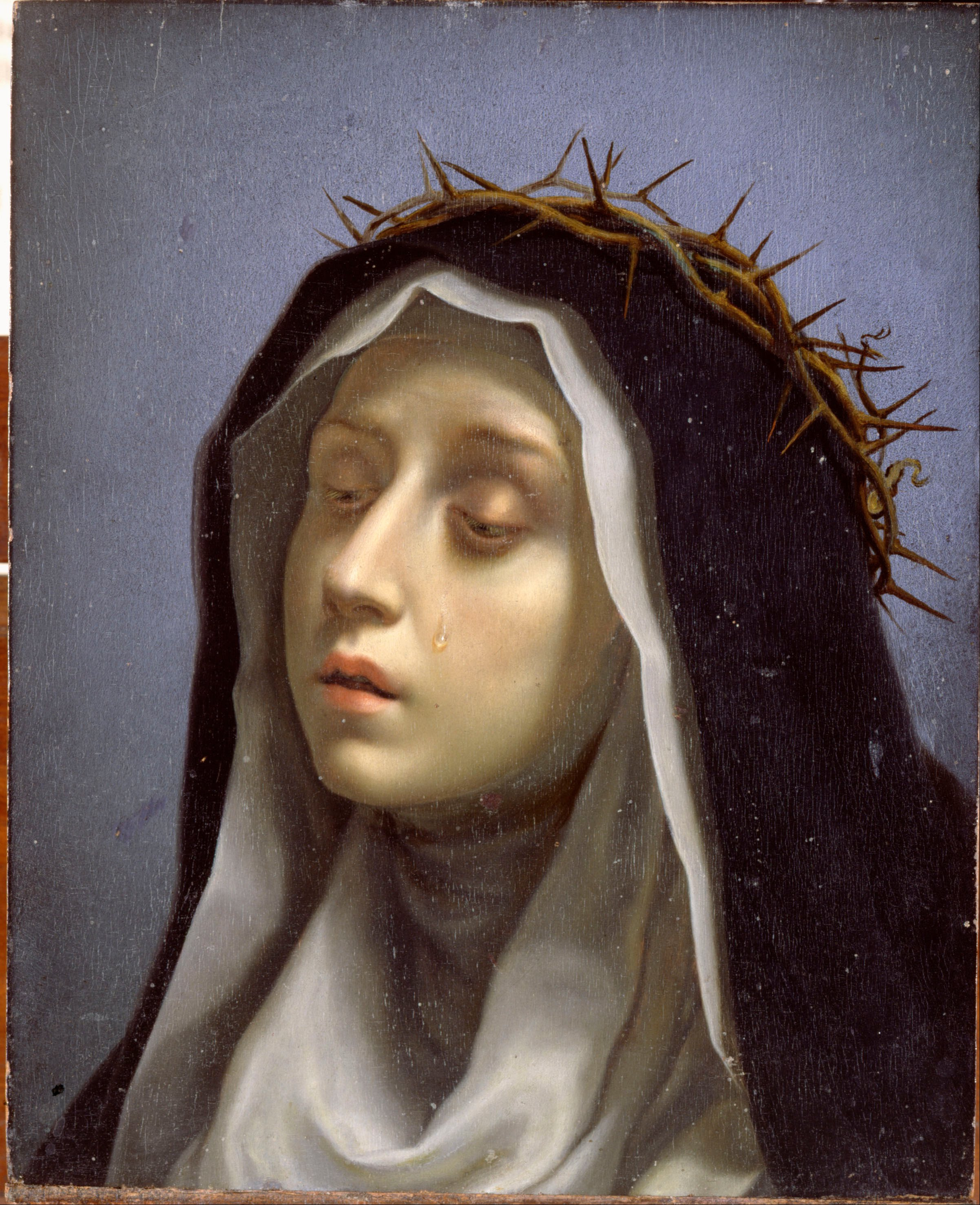
St. Catherine of Siena, (c. 1665), oil on cedar panel, 24.4 x 18.1 cm, Dulwich Picture Gallery

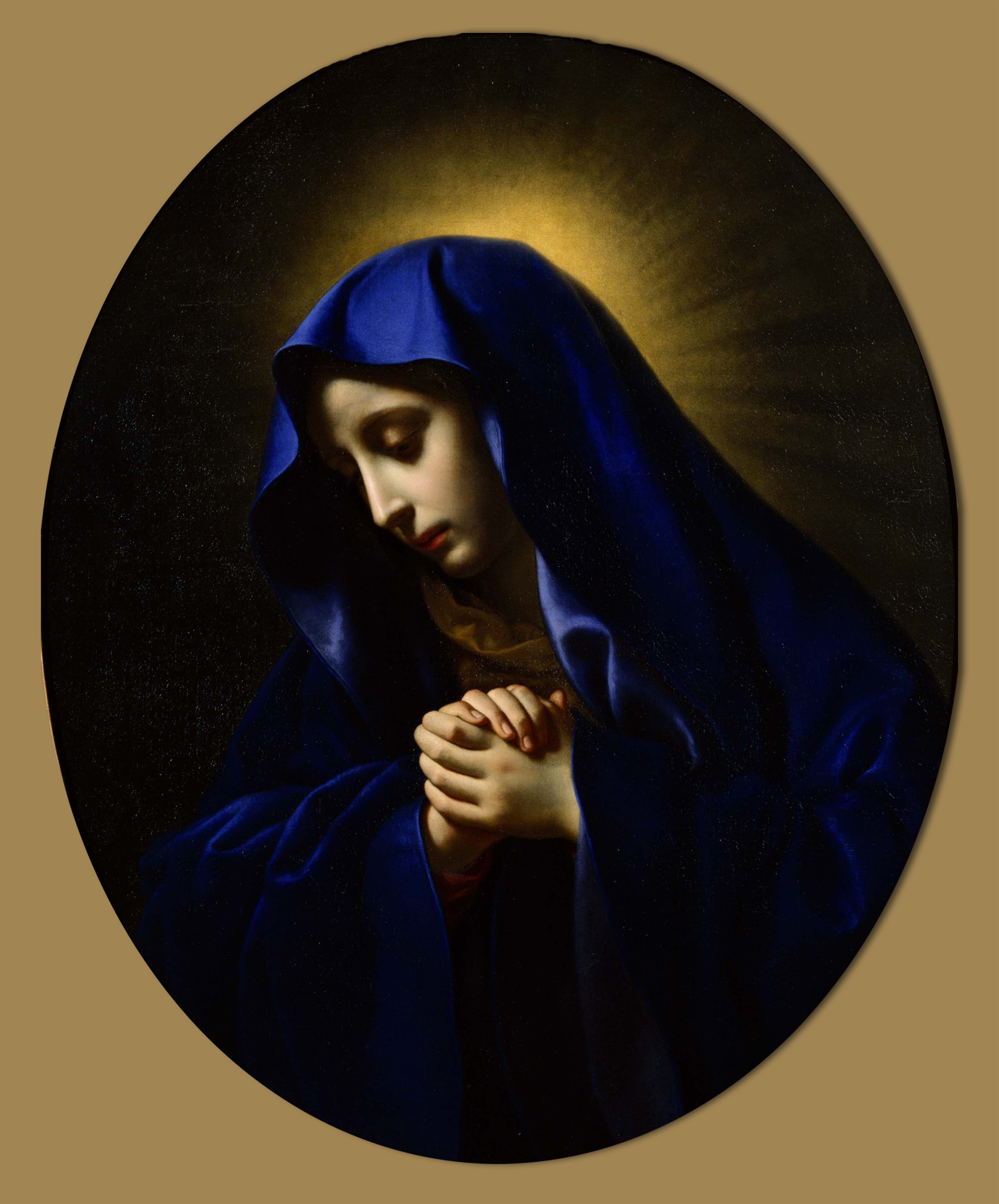
Mater Dolorosa (c. 1655), oil on canvas, 82.5 x 67 cm, National Museum of Western Art, Tokyo

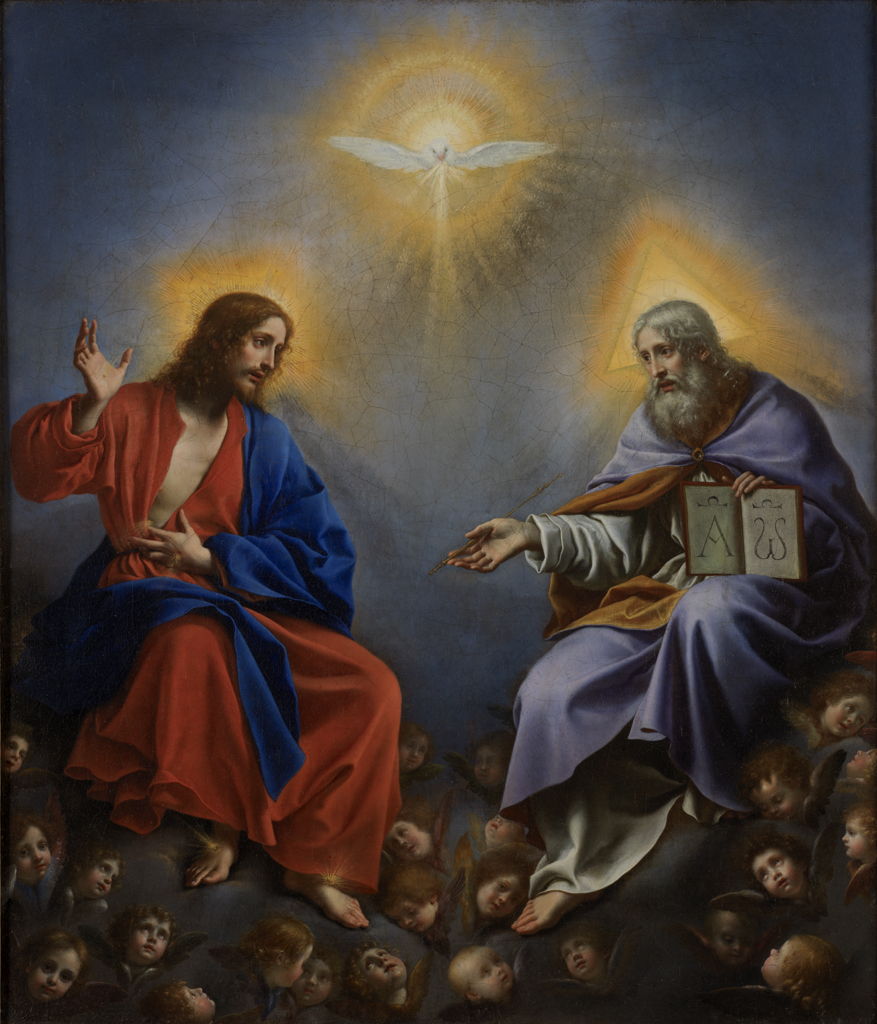
The Trinity in Glory (c. 1640), oil on canvas, 69.5 x 59.7 cm, Rhode Island School of Design Museum

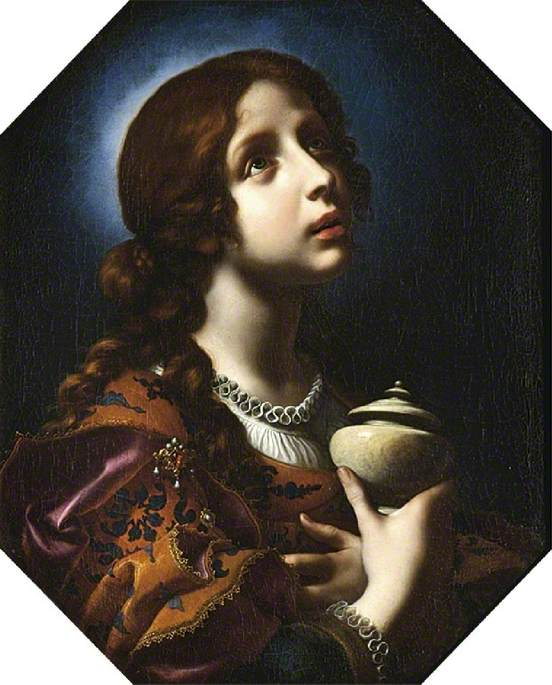
The Penitent Magdalene (1650–1651), oil on canvas, 64.4 x 52.7 cm, Fitzwilliam Museum, Cambridge

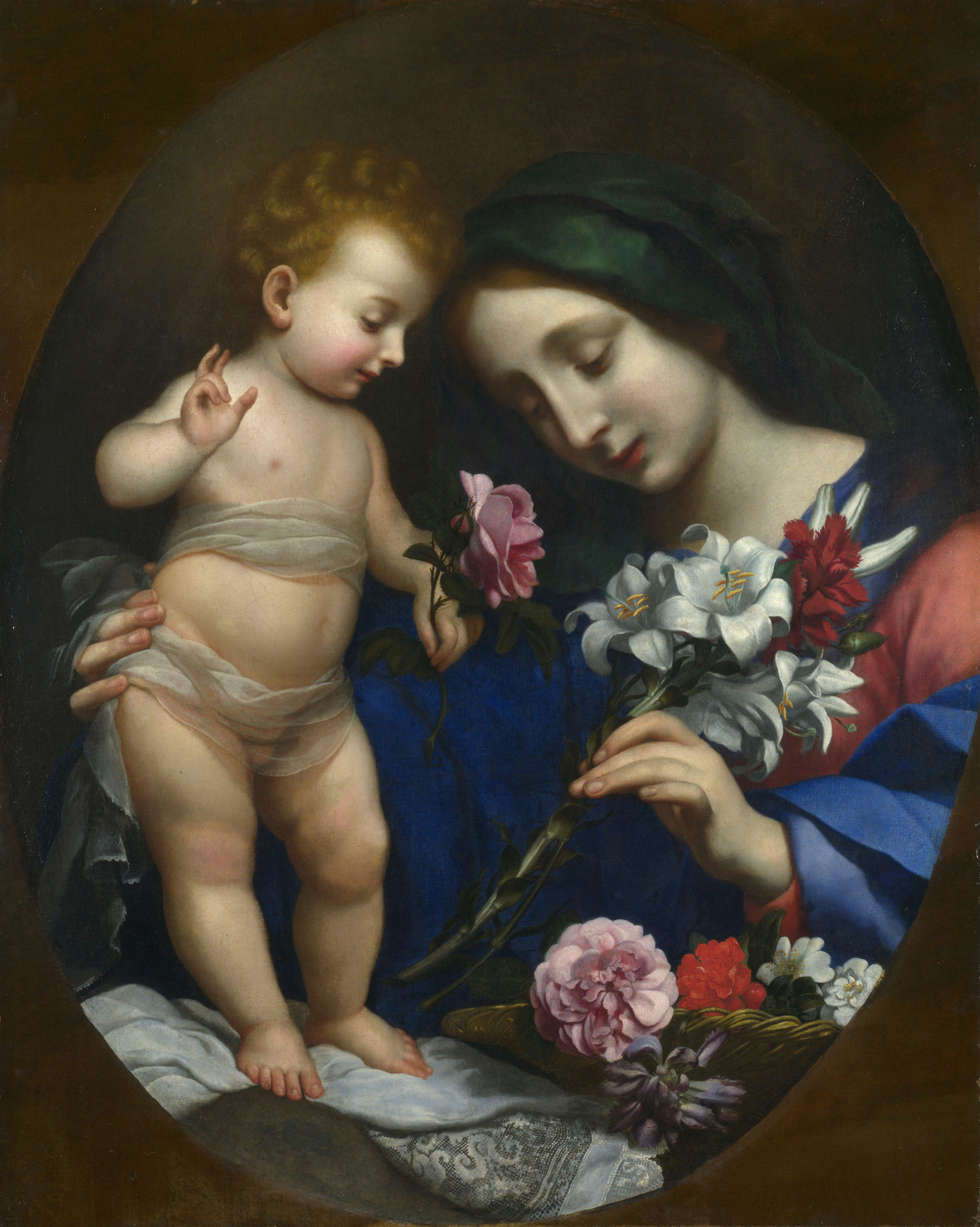
The Virgin and Child with Flowers (1643–1647), oil on canvas, 78.1 x 63.2 cm, National Gallery, London

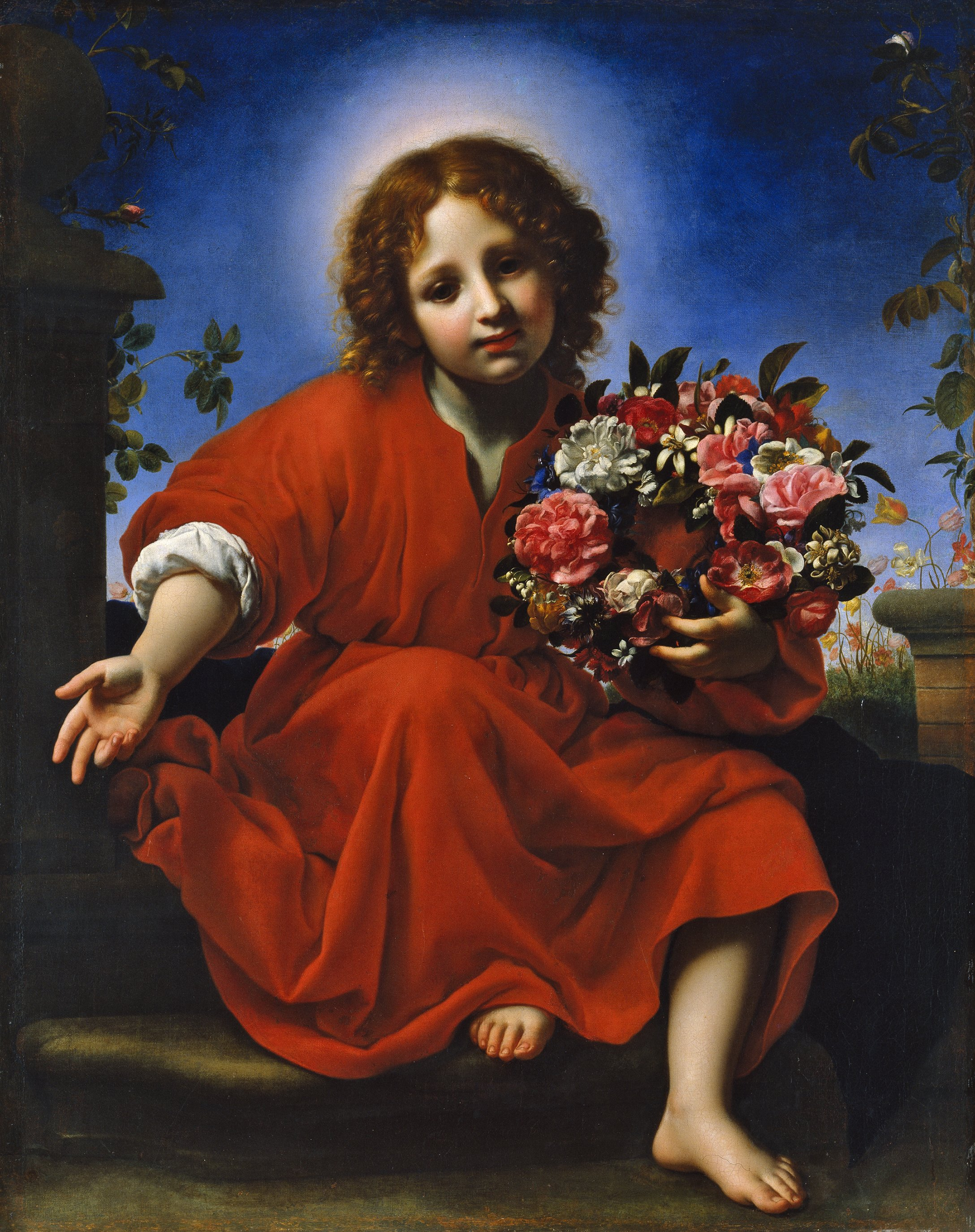
Jesus with flowers (1663), oil on canvas, 103 x 71 cm, Thyssen-Bornemisza Museum, Madrid

Vase of Flowers (1662), oil on canvas, 70 x 55 cm, Florence, Uffizi

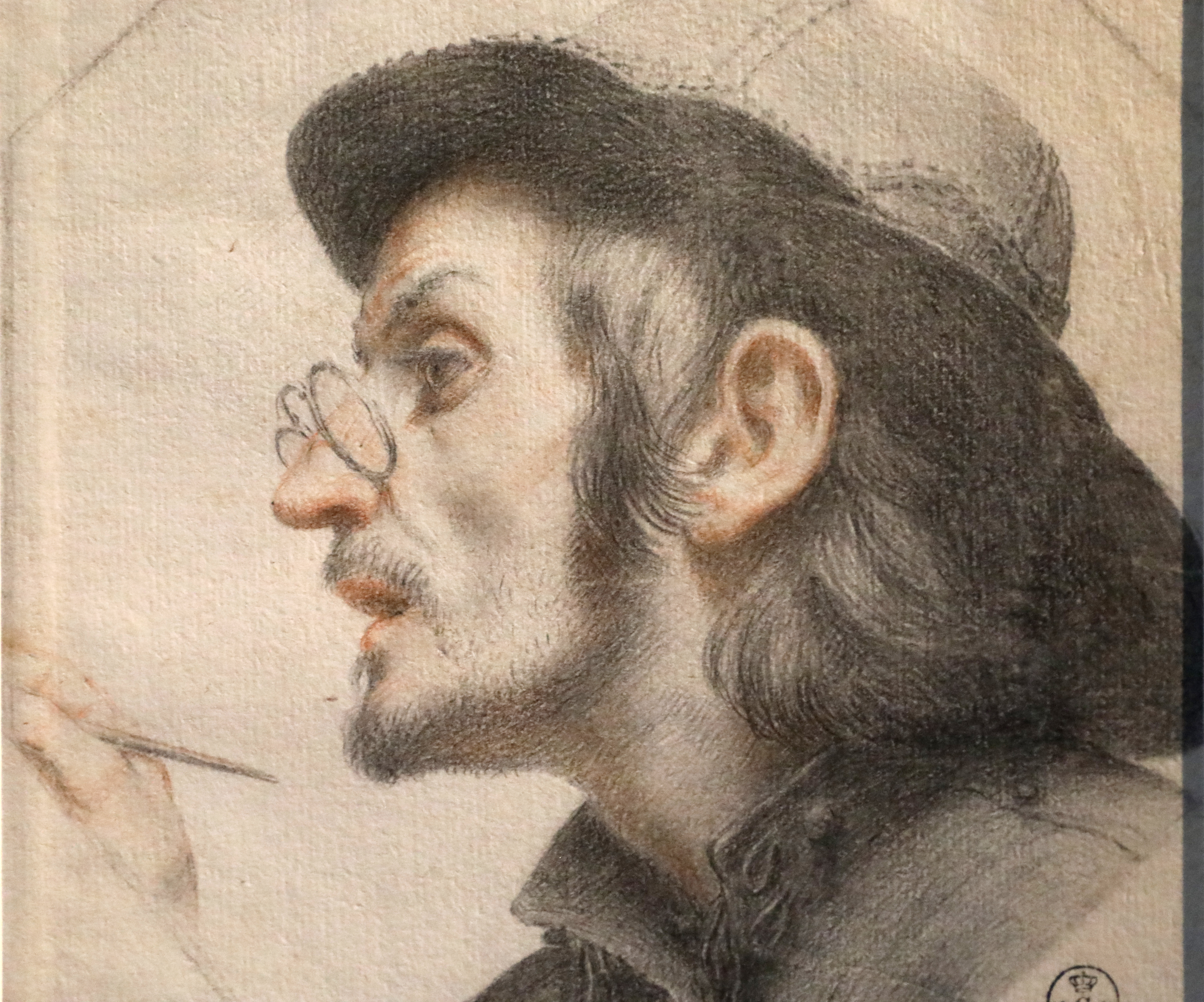
Self portrait (before 1674), red and black chalk on pale gray paper, Gabinetto dei Disegni e delle Stampe, Uffizi, Florence

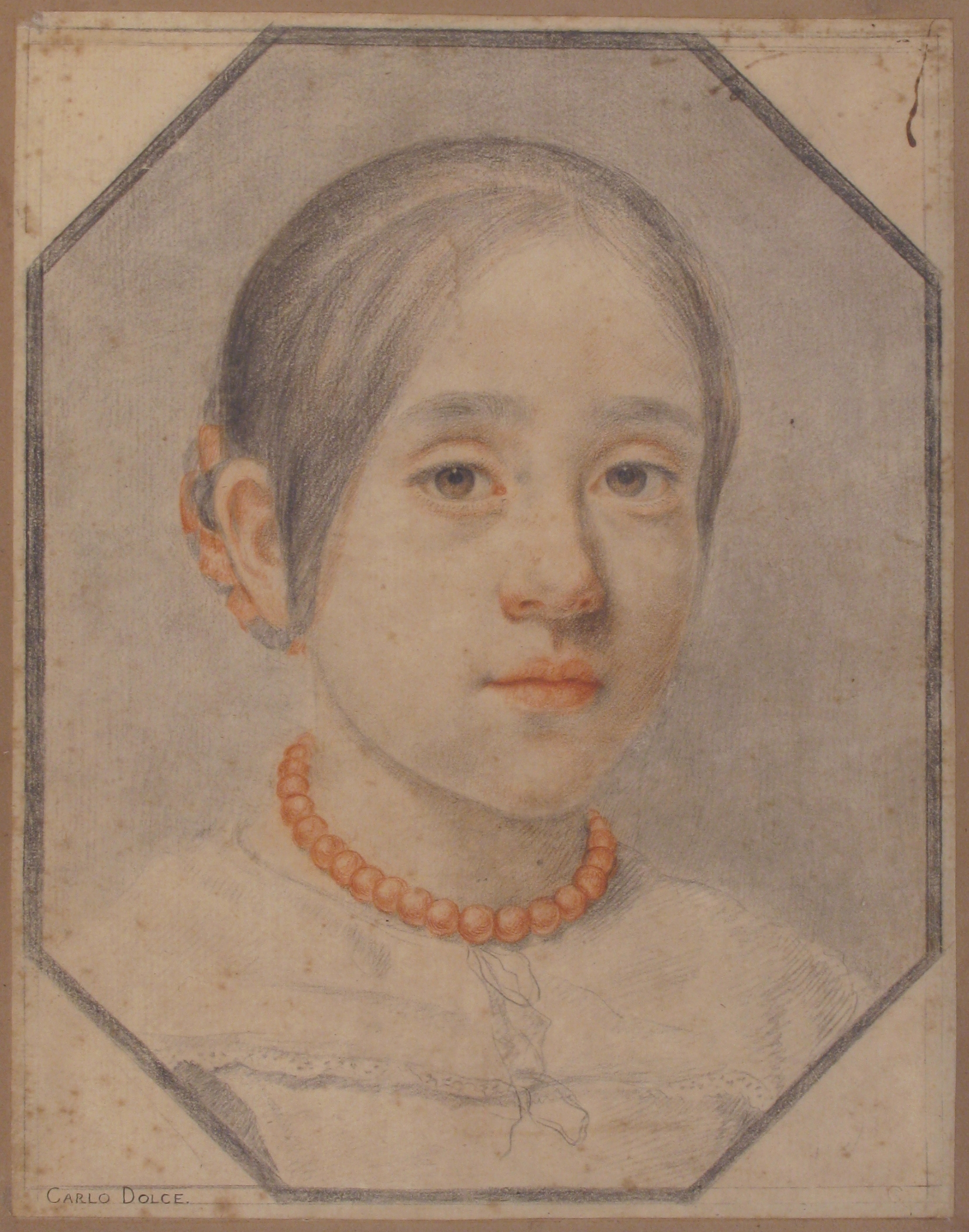
Portrait of the Artist's Daughter (1676–1680), red and black chalk on pale gray paper, 25.8 x 20.2cm, Metropolitan Museum of Art, New York

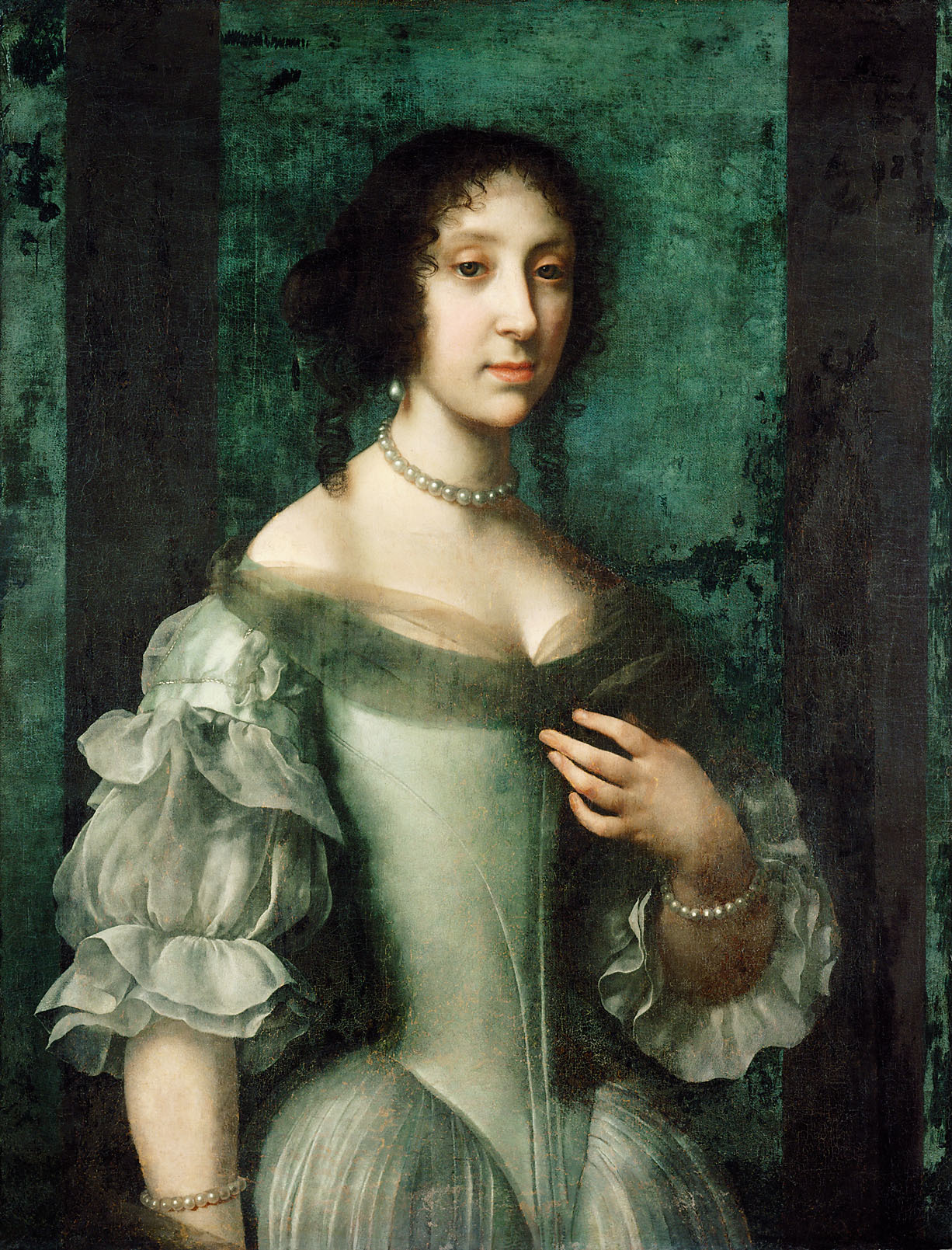
Portrait of Claudia Felicitas of Austria (1672), oil on canvas 90.5 x 69.5 cm, Kunsthistorisches Museum, Vienna

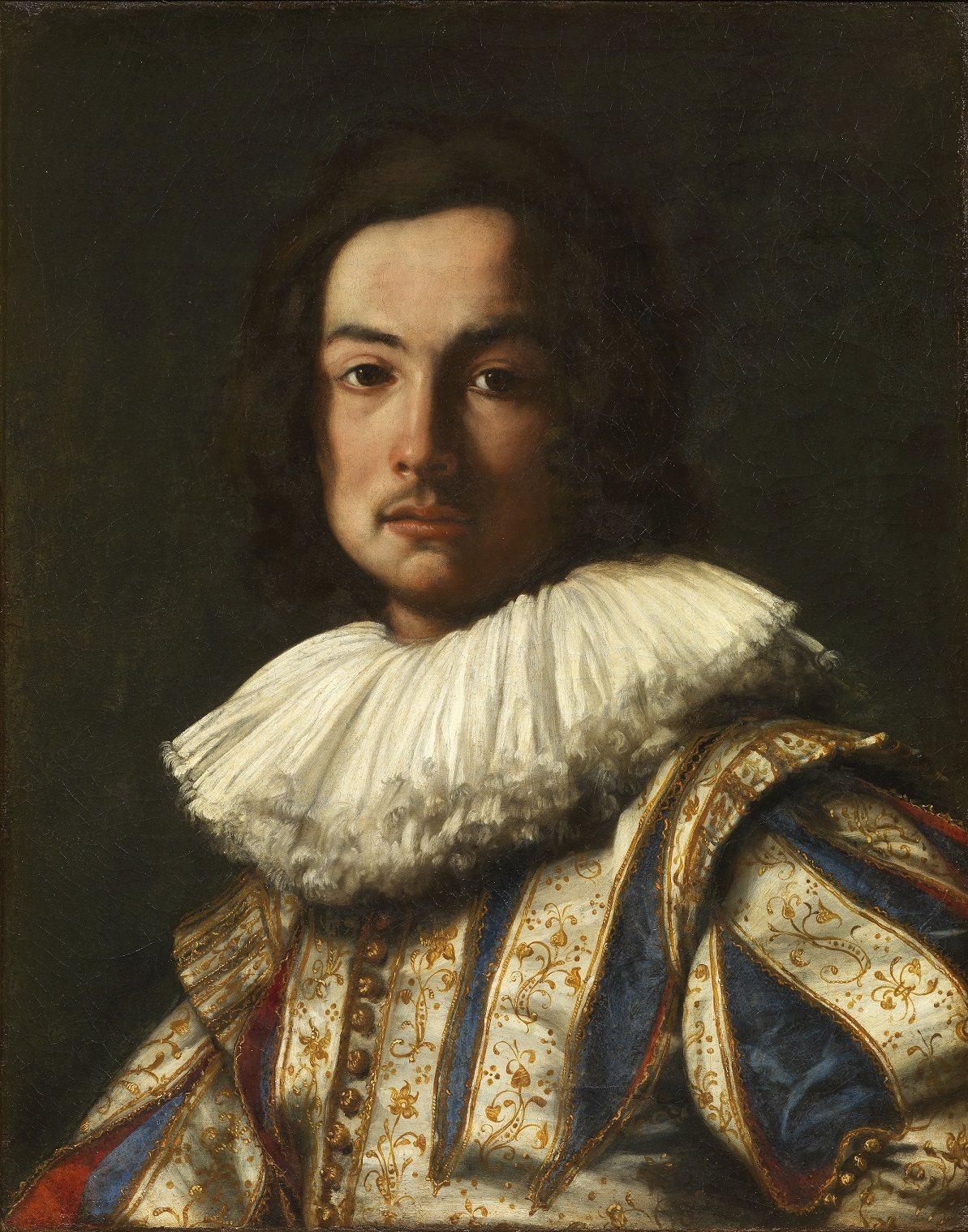
Portrait of Stefano della Bella (1631), oil on canvas, 59 x 48 cm, Florence, Palazzo Pitti

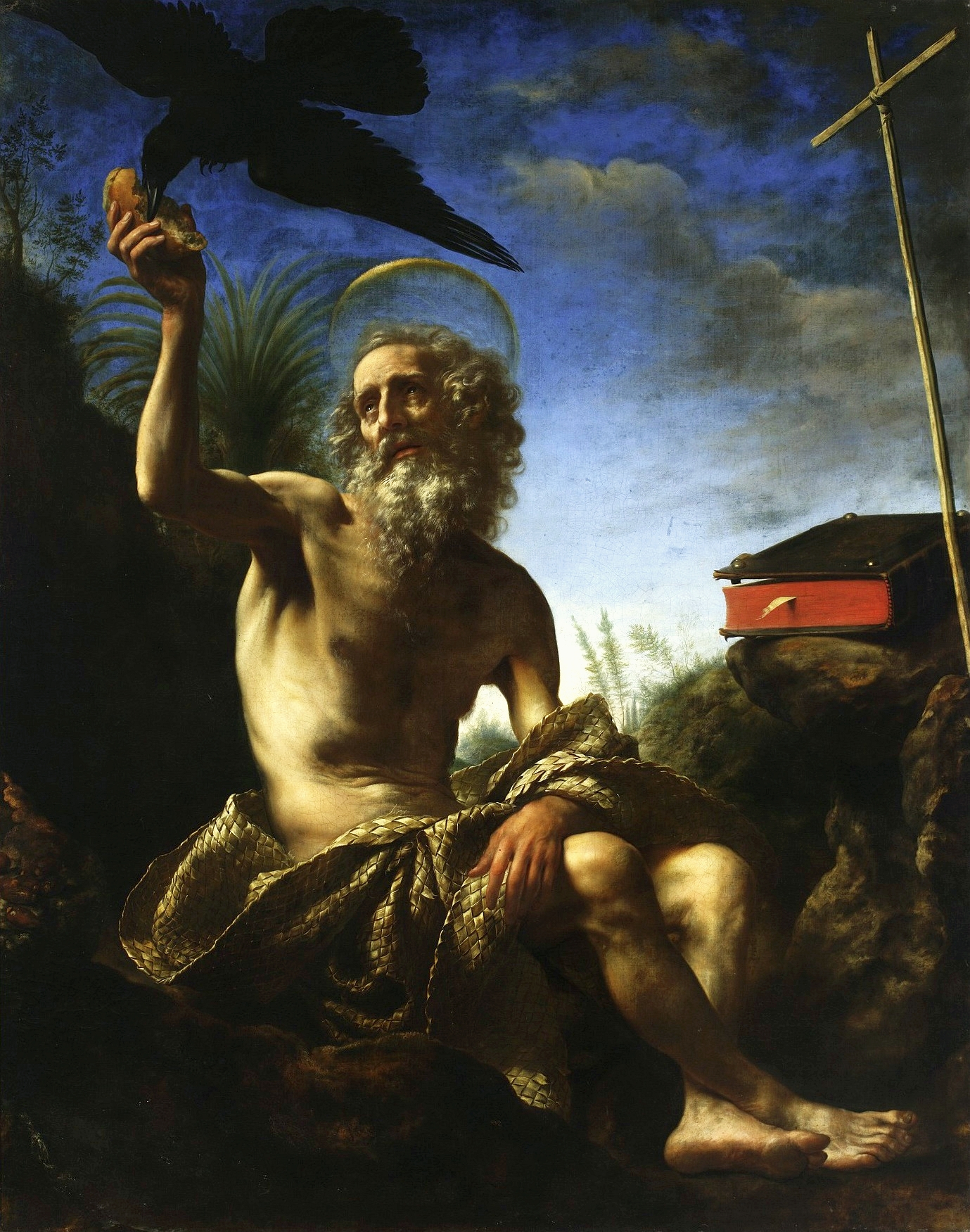
Saint Paul the Hermit (before 1648), oil on canvas, 168.5 x 132 cm, National Museum, Warsaw

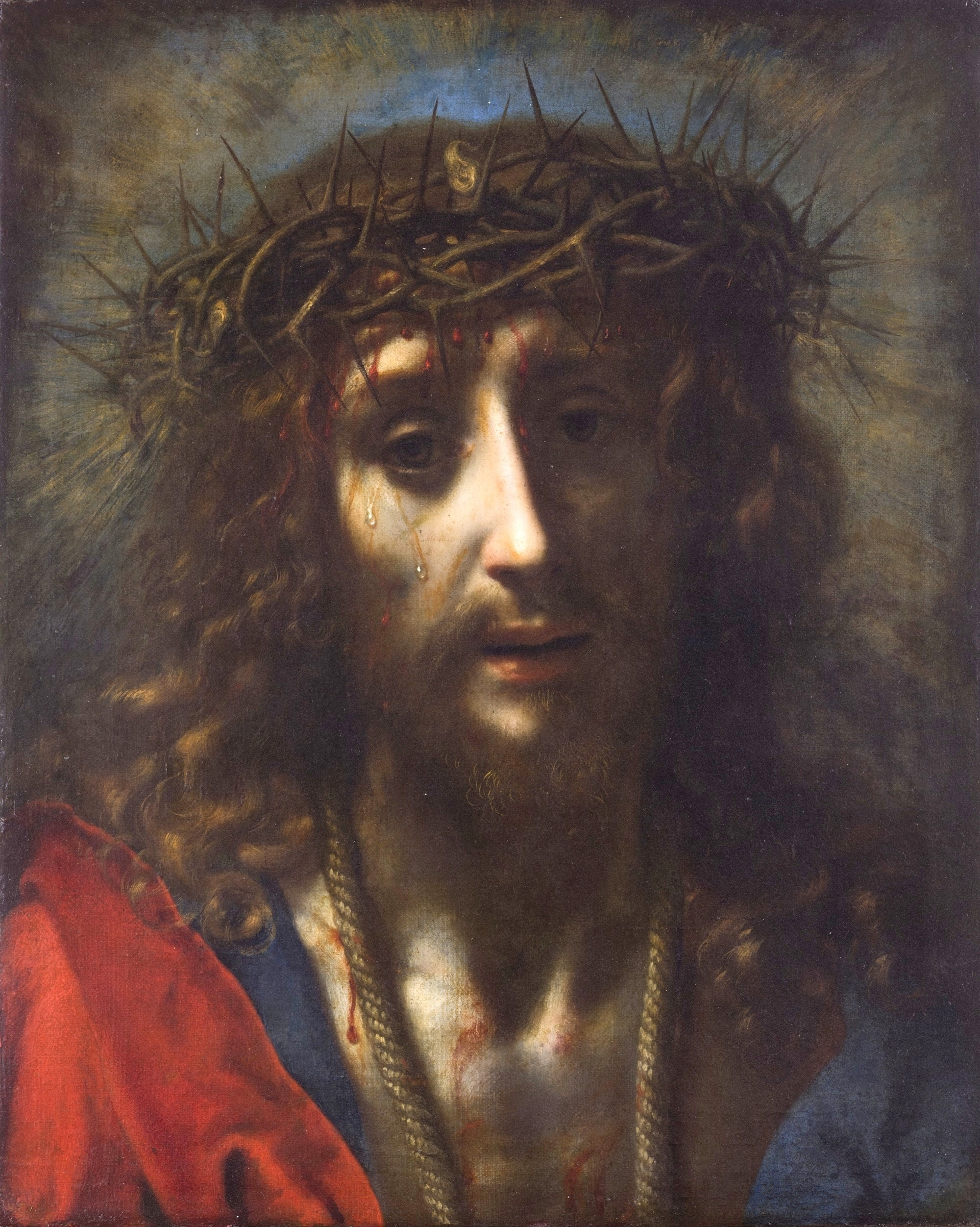
Ecce Homo, (c. 1635), oil on canvas, 48.5 x 38.5 cm, Tarnów District Museum
