= Agnese Dolci =

Italian artist (1635–1686)

- Self Portrait
- Born: 1635; Italy
- Died: 1686 (aged 50–51)
- Known for: Painting

Agnese Dolci (1635–1686) was an Italian painter and the daughter of Carlo Dolci.

Little is known of her life. Works by her are mostly attributed to her father or are called copies after her father. Two paintings Jesus took bread and blessed it and Maria and Child were included in the 1905 book Women Painters of the World.

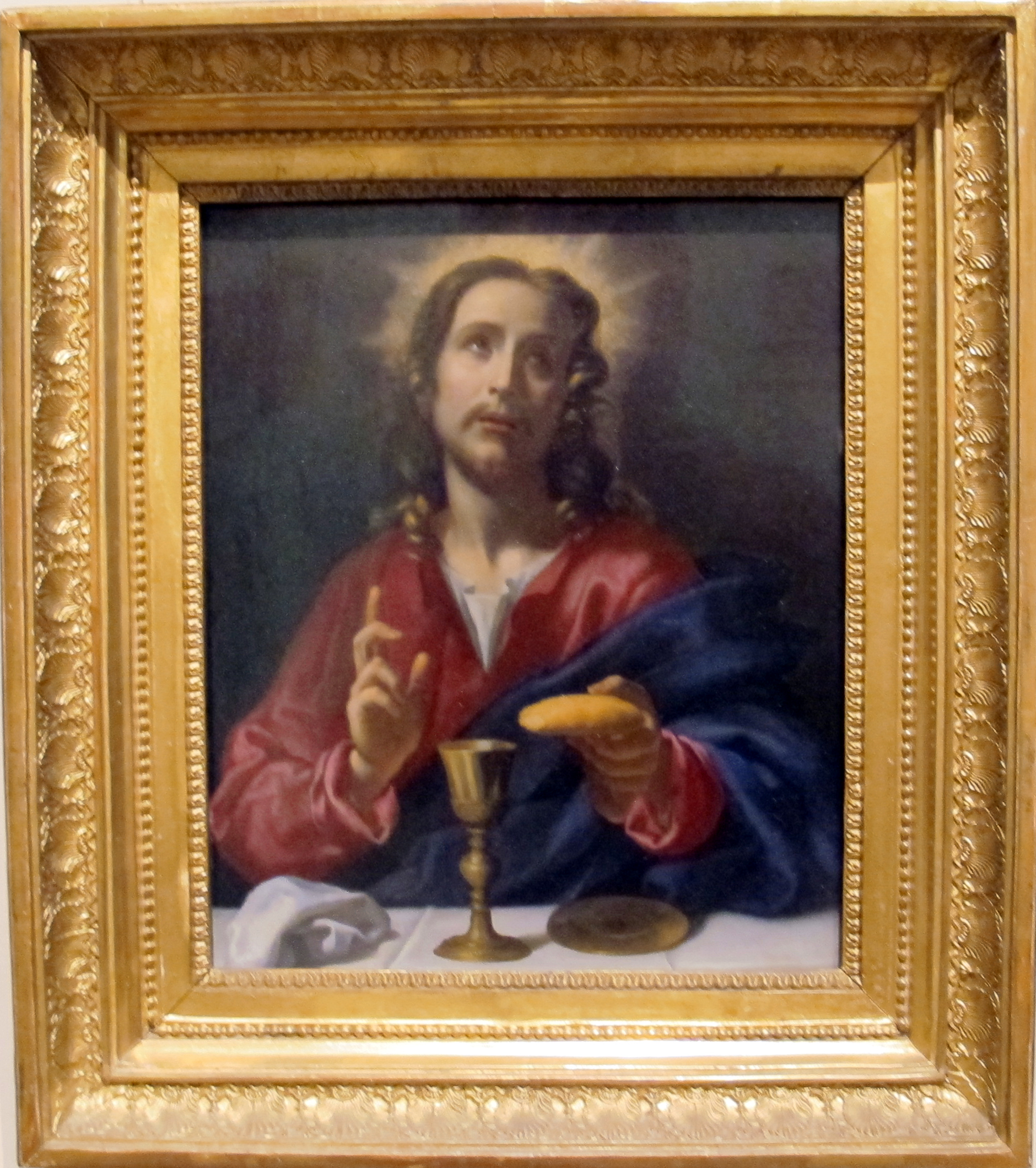
Jesus took bread and blessed it, collection of the Louvre

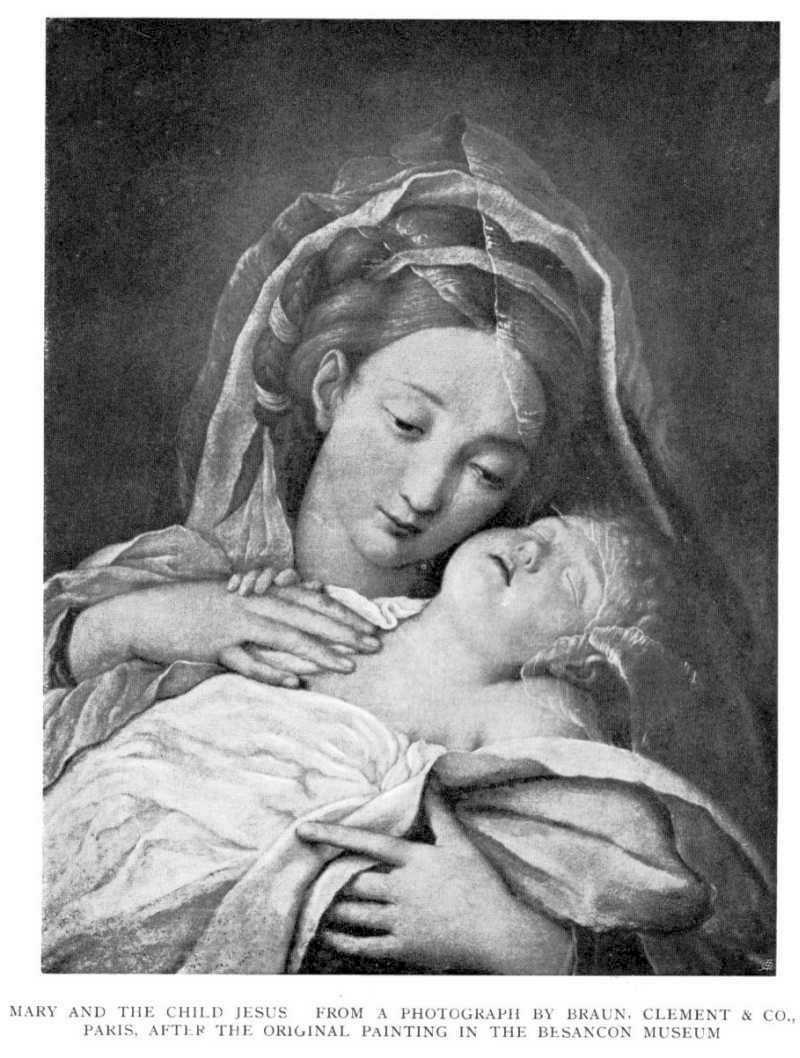
Maria and Child, collection of the Musée des Beaux-Arts de Besançon
