= Albert Henry Payne =

German painter

- The Wreath-Maker, steel engraving after Johann Georg Meyer
- Born: 14 December 1812; London
- Died: 7 May 1902; Leipzig
- Citizenship: British
- Occupations: engraver, painter and illustrator

Albert Henry Payne (14 December 1812 – 7 May 1902) was an English steel engraver, painter and illustrator. Though English by birth, he lived and worked in Leipzig from 1839 onward.

== Biography ==
Albert Henry Payne arrived in Germany at a young age. From 1839 onwards, he was active in Leipzig as a steel engraver, painter, and illustrator. In 1845, he co-founded the publishing house "Englische Kunstanstalt" (English Art Institute) with E.T. Brain, and in 1846, he took full ownership of the firm. It was one of the first printing-industry enterprises established in Leipzig’s "Graphic Quarter" (Graphisches Viertel). Payne specialized in steel engravings that served a growing market for "penny prints" sold to tourists of views of popular German destinations.

In 1861, Payne purchased the four-to-five-hectare "Großer Kuchengarten" estate and commissioned the construction of what became known as the "Gothic House" (Gotisches Haus). This new building – later expanded and remodeled – became the headquarters of the Englische Kunstanstalt, which, after his death, was ran by his son. The Payne publishing firm was not removed from the commercial register until 1952. It specialized in steel and copper engraving, producing illustrated family journals, calendars, and musical scores. The series Payne’s kleine Partitur-Ausgabe (Payne’s Small Score Edition) was sold to the music publisher Ernst Eulenburg in 1892.

== Works ==
Payne produced a bird’s-eye view of Bremen and steel engravings depicting Bremen and Bremerhaven, based on drawings by the Hamburg-based painter and lithographer Johann Heinrich Sander (1810–1865). Payne's engravings were included in the 1841 book Wanderungen an der Nord- und Ostsee (Wanderings along the North and Baltic Seas) by Theodor von Kobbe (1798–1845). In the 1840s, Payne created twenty steel engravings of Leipzig and a steel engraving of Altenburg Castle.

Payne is best known today for his 1840s engravings after paintings in the Gemäldegalerie Alte Meister that were described in German essays by Adolph Görling. Payne published an illustrated bundle of these German essays in 1848, translated into English with the title Royal Dresden Gallery : being a selection of subjects engraved after pictures by the great masters. The book was quite popular and an 1867 edition was published in New York City by D. Appleton & Co.

== Gallery ==
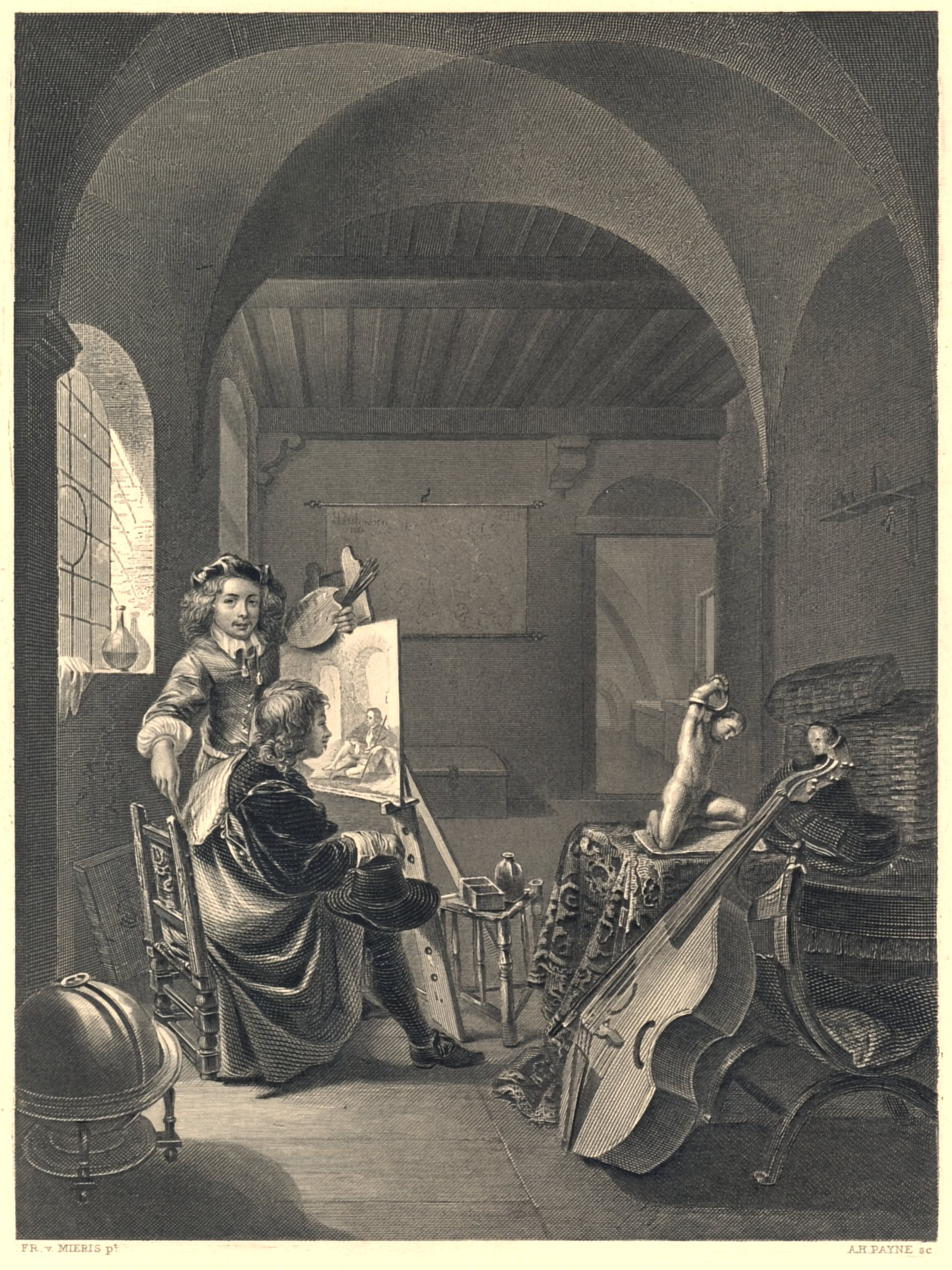
The Painter in his Studio, steel engraving after Frans van Mieris the Elder

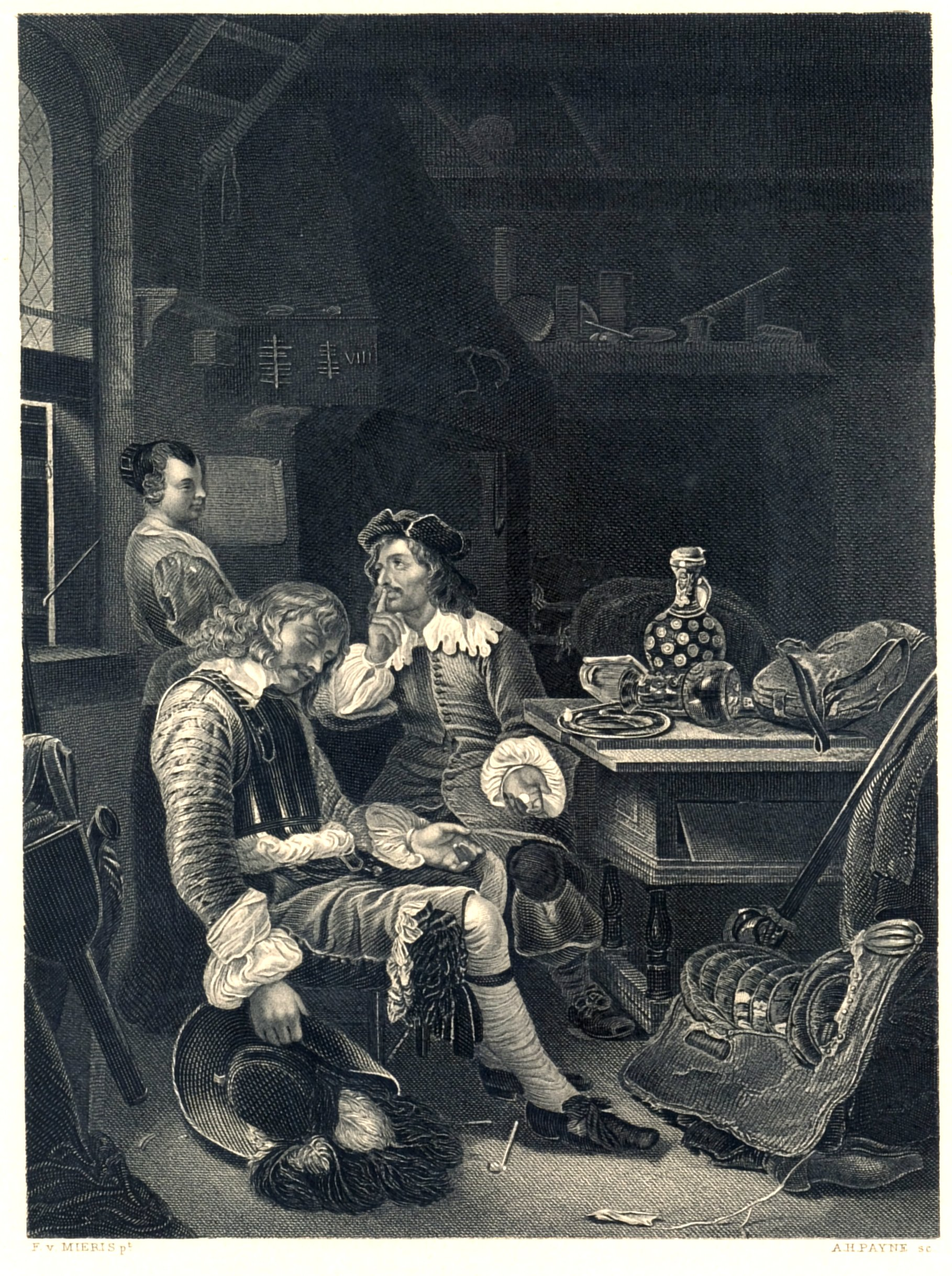
The Guard Room, steel engraving by Payne after Frans van Mieris the Elder

Caritas Romana, steel engraving after Gerard van Honthorst

Saint Cecilia, steel engraving Carlo Dolci

All Nine Pins Down, steel engraving after Johann Peter Hasenclever

Lady Playing the Harpsichord, steel engraving after Caspar Netscher

Violin Player, steel engraving after Gerard Dou

Diana Returning from the Hunt, steel engraving after Peter Paul Rubens

== Bibliography ==
- "Payne, Albert Henry". Benezit Dictionary of Artists. Oxford: Oxford University Press. 2011. doi:10.1093/benz/9780199773787.article.B00137413.
