= Danielle Mckinney =

American artist (born 1981)

- Born: 1981 (age 44–45); Montgomery, Alabama
- Education: Atlanta College of Art, BFA; Parsons School of Design, MFA

Danielle Joy Mckinney (born 1981) is a contemporary visual artist who resides and works in New Jersey. Her paintings have been included in exhibitions in United States.

== Early life ==
Danielle Mckinney was born in Montgomery, Alabama in 1981, where she was raised as a Southern Baptist. Mckinney has always been connected to visual art. Her grandmother introduced her to painting and signed her up for lessons, and her mother gifted her an old Nikon film camera when Mckinney was 15. Further into her academic career Mckinney got her start in photography, earning a BFA from the Atlanta College of Art and later an MFA in the medium from Parsons School of Design. Though she painted on the side, it was only when Mckinney spent two years in Pont-Aven, France, before graduate school that she formally took up painting classes for the first time. Even though she had a passion for photography during the COVID-19 lockdown, she pursued her career of painting full-time.

== Career ==
Mckinney is based in New Jersey. She produces story paintings that highlight the independent Black female lead. Mckinney catches the figure engaged in leisurely activities and intense reflections. Her paintings reveal hidden storylines and evoke surreal settings, frequently in the context of the internal home world, as she engages with topics of spirituality and self. With a background in photography paints with a keen awareness of the female gaze, using very vivid colors and subtle details with "cinematic effect."

Mckinney views her work as a place of reconciliation between her Black female identity and the possibilities of rest and liberation that dominant visual culture has failed to depict, even though her paintings are not self-portraits. She paints with the intention of evoking this sensation of identification between the viewer and the subject, giving them both the opportunity to enter their most liberated selves.

Mckinney made Reading Room, an acrylic on canvas painting, in 2022.

In 2024, Mckinney presented her first solo exhibition in Italy at the Fondazione Sandretto Re Rebaudengo. Fly on the Wall expands on Mckinney's pictorial interest and depictions of Black women portraiture in intimate spaces.

== Exhibitions ==
● 2021 SAW MY SHADOW, Fortnight Institute | New York

● 2022 Golden Hour, Marianne Boesky Gallery | New York

● 2022 Smoke and Mirrors, Night Gallery | Los Angeles

● 2022 IN A DREAM YOU SAW A WAY TO SURVIVE AND YOU WERE FULL OF JOY, The Contemporary Austin | Texas

● 2022 Black Melancholia, Hessel Museum of Art | New York

== Collections ==
Danielle Mckinney's paintings are included in the collections of museums worldwide including the Pérez Art Museum Miami, Florida; Buffalo AKG Art Museum, New York; Dallas Museum of Art, Texas; Hirshhorn Museum and Sculpture Garden, Washington DC; the Studio Museum in Harlem, New York; Speed Art Museum, Kentucky; and the Israel Museum, Jerusalem; among others.
