= The Reading Room (Hasenclever) =

1843 painting by Johann Peter Hasenclever

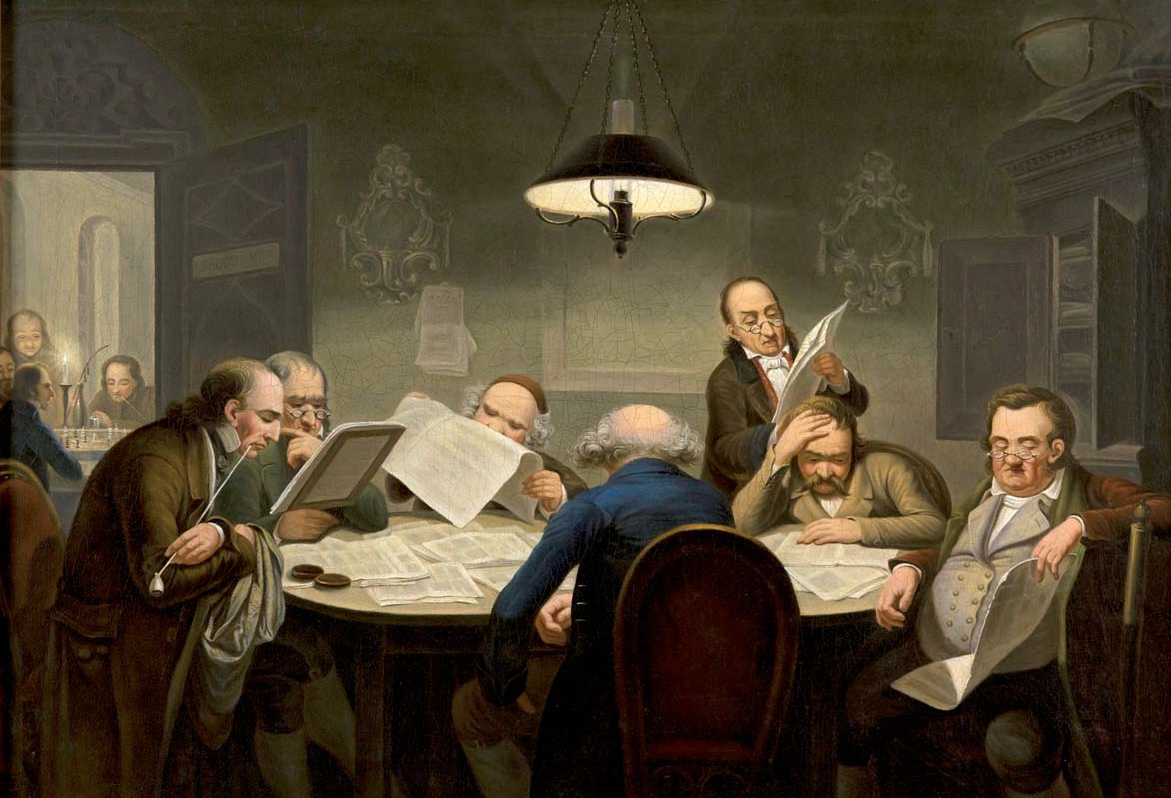
- Artist: Johann Peter Hasenclever
- Year: 1843
- Medium: oil on canvas
- Movement: Düsseldorf School
- Dimensions: 71 cm × 100 cm (28 in × 39 in)
- Location: Alte Nationalgalerie, Berlin

The Reading Room (German: Das Lesekabinett) is an 1843 painting by the Düsseldorf-based painter Johann Peter Hasenclever, now in the Alte Nationalgalerie in Berlin. It shows a genre scene of middle-class men in a reading room, reflecting the political and cultural situation of the Vormärz period. A smaller copy is now in the Städtische Museum Remscheid (Haus Cleff in Remscheid-Hasten).
