= Johann Peter Hasenclever =

German painter (1810–1853)

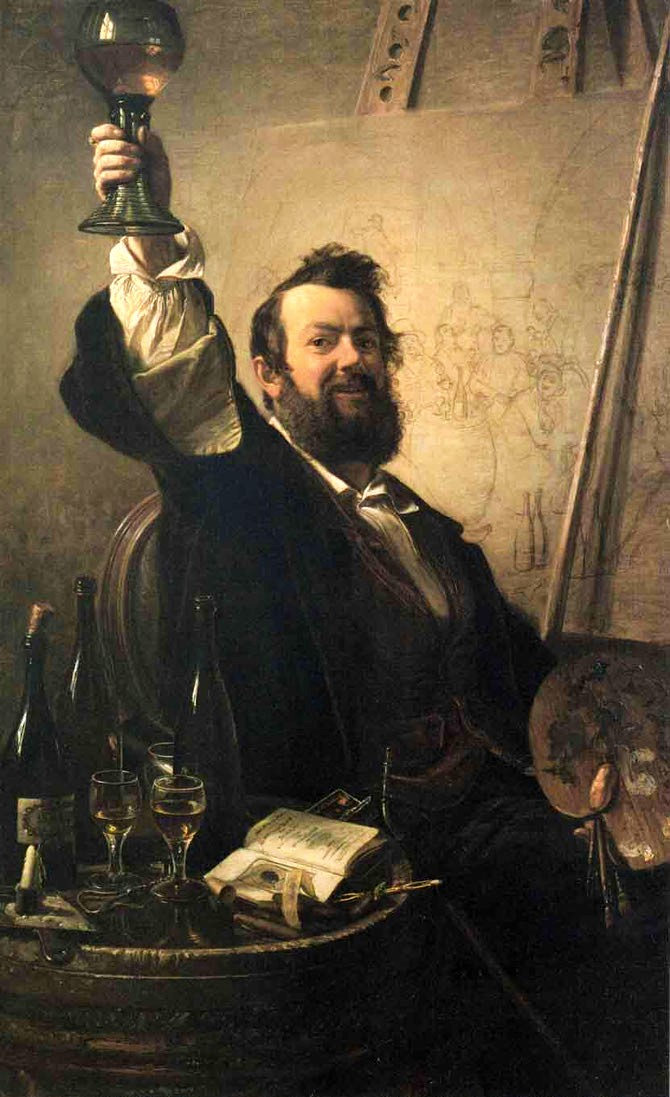
Self-portrait (c.1851)

Johann Peter Hasenclever (18 May 1810 – 16 December 1853) was a German genre painter associated with the Düsseldorfer Malerschule.

== Life and work ==
He was born in Remscheid. His father, Johann Peter Hasenclever (1784–1864), was a toolsmith involved in the local iron trade. In 1825, he went away to school in Ronsdorf and moved into the home of his teacher, Johann Peter Fasbender, who recognized and encouraged his talent for drawing. When he was seventeen, he enrolled at the Kunstakademie Düsseldorf, under the direction of Friedrich Wilhelm von Schadow. However, he left after only two years, when Schadow expressed serious doubts about his abilities. He made a second attempt in 1836, studying with Theodor Hildebrandt, a great admirer of Dutch Golden Age art. At that time, genre painting was relatively new to Germany, so this had a significant influence on Hasenclever's choice of subject matter.

His first success followed his move to Munich in 1838, where he was commissioned to create illustrations for the satirical poem Jobsiade, by Carl Arnold Kortum; the story of a "perpetual student", who ends up working as a night watchman. He created twenty paintings that were lithographed for the book. One of them, "Hieronymus Jobs at the Exam", was acquired by King Ludwig I of Bavaria in 1840. Three years, he returned to Düsseldorf as a famous painter and was named a member of the Prussian Academy of Arts. It was during this time that he became known for his depictions of everyday life in the Biedermeier period.

Shortly after returning, he married Caroline Anna Babette (1821–1895), said to be the illegitimate child of Major Alois Trentini (1790–1864) and Babette Winter, a blacksmith's daughter from Munich. They had three children, Carolina Laura Louisa (b.1844), who became a teacher, and two sons. Their first son, Peter (1847–1920) was a drawing professor at a gymnasium in Munich. Their second son, Ernst (b.1852), apparently became a painter, although little is known about him.

He took part in the political activities of the Vormärz, and was one of the first painters in Germany to produce art with social commentary. He became a member of the anti-academic artist's association, "Crignic", which gave rise to the organization known as "Malkasten" (Paintbox). From 1847, he contributed to the satirical Düsseldorfer Monathefte. When the revolution of 1848 broke out, he became a deputy platoon leader for the vigilance committee.

He died of typhus in Düsseldorf, aged only forty-three. Shortly before his death, Karl Marx had praised his work in the New York Daily Tribune, specifically citing his painting "Worker's Delegation Before the Magistrate", as an example of proletarian art. In the 1960s and 70s, this would lead to a renewed interest in his works within the German Democratic Republic; beginning in 1964, when the art historian, Wolfgang Hütt, started investigating Marxist elements in the paintings of the Düsseldorf school.

== Selected paintings ==
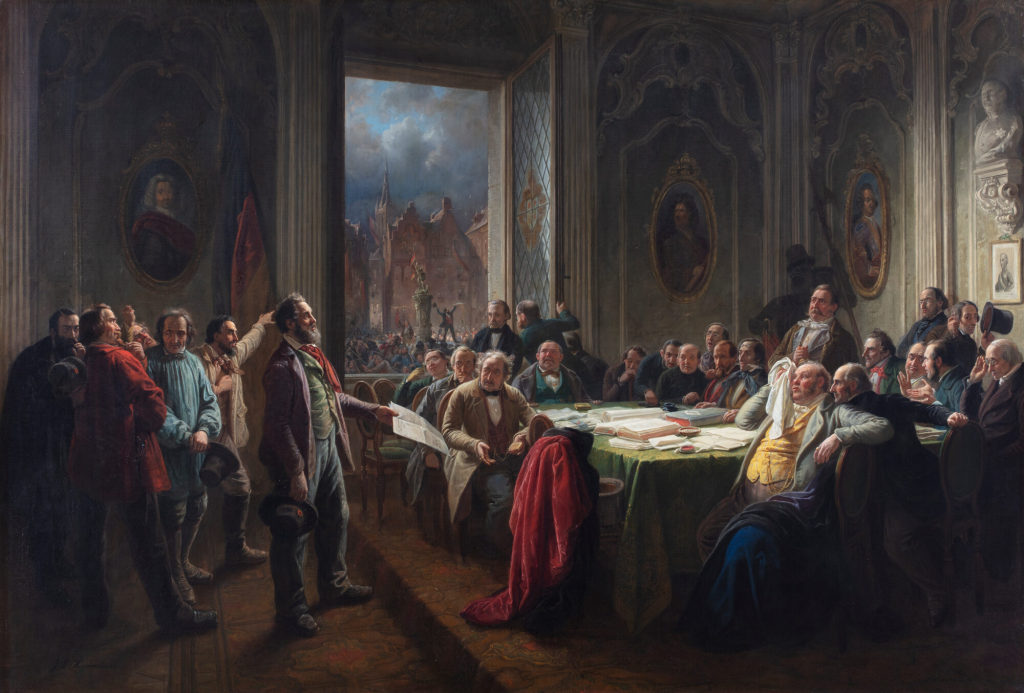
Worker's Delegation Before the Magistrate

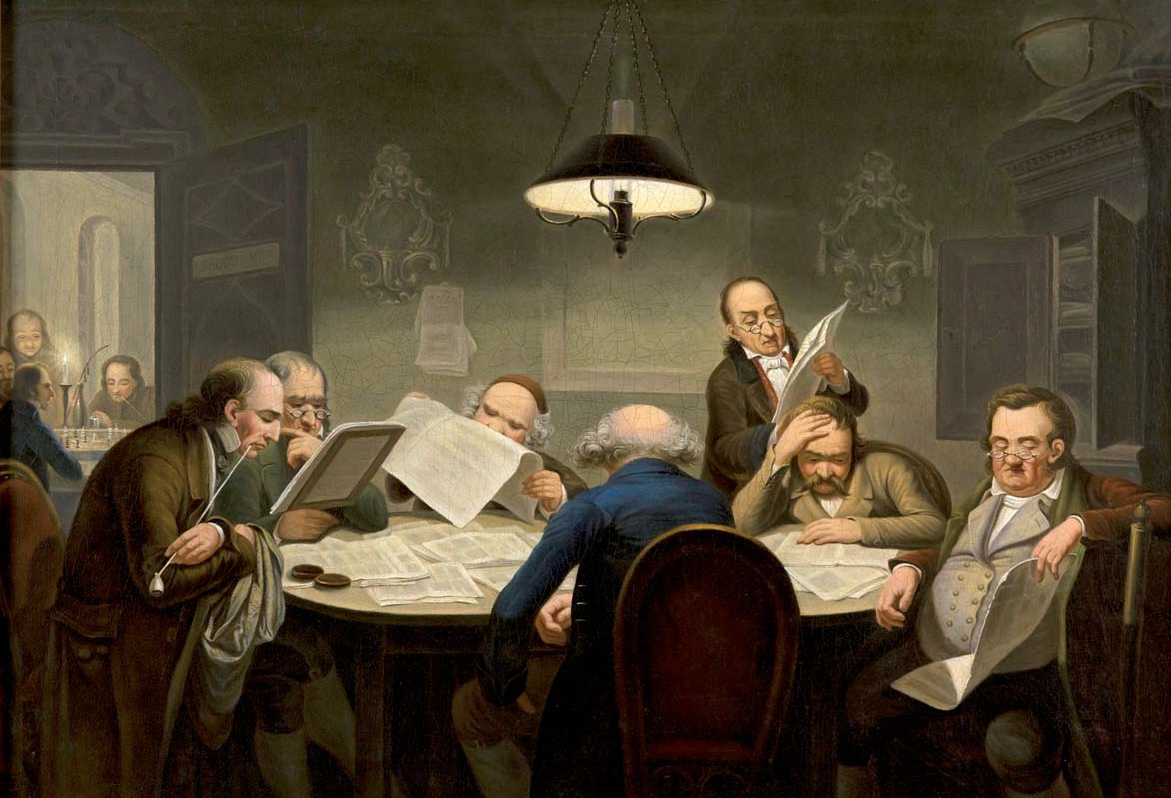
The Reading Room

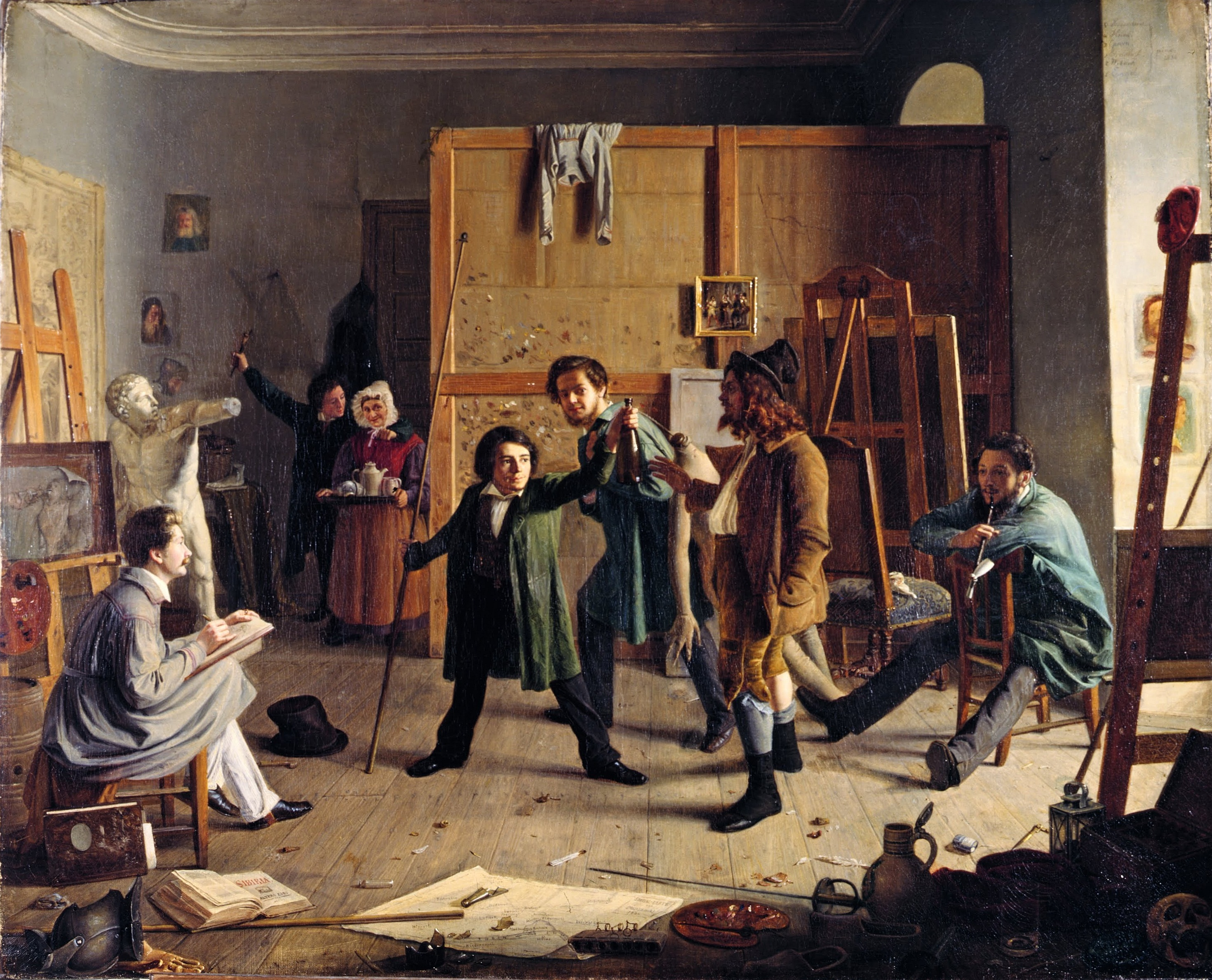
A Scene in the Studio

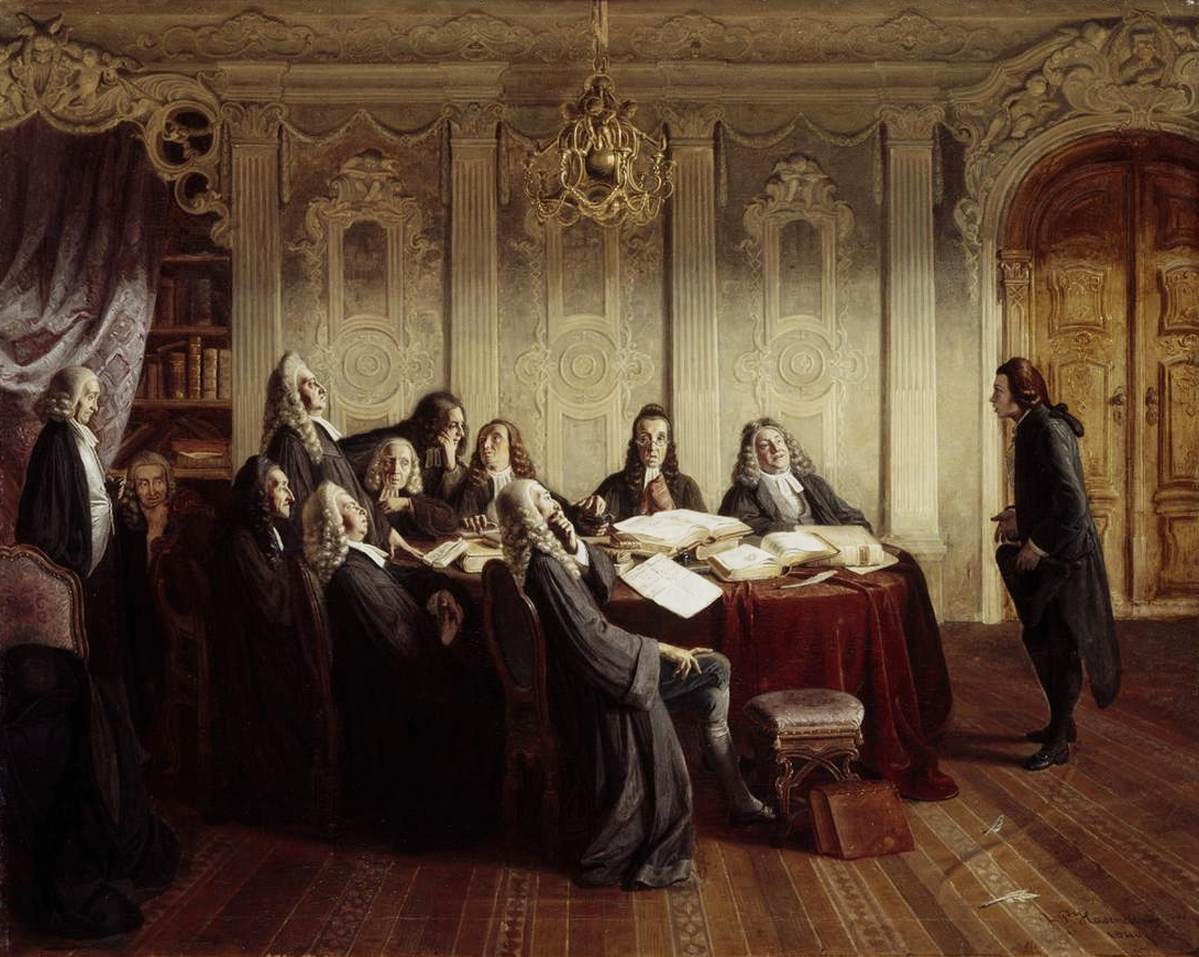
Hieronymus Jobs at the Exam
