= Reading Room (painting) =

2022 painting by Danielle Mckinney

- Artist: Danielle Mckinney
- Year: 2022
- Medium: Acrylic on canvas

Reading Room is an acrylic on canvas painting made by American artist Danielle Mckinney in 2022. Reading Room was first exhibited under "Golden Hour" at Marianne Boesky Gallery in New York City, from October 13 to November 12, 2022. The painting explores themes of Black femininity, agency, rest, and solitude.

== Description ==
The work shows a nude black female figure reclined atop an electric blue surface within a blank, dimly lit interior. The chiaroscuro of the room creates a protective dimness, with the figure gently illuminated. The figure holds a book in her left hand positioned in front of her face, and in her right she holds a lit cigarette, representing the ultimate human sensation of taking a deep exhale. The bright orange of the lit cigarette, along with the figure’s bright orange painted finger and toenails serve as a moment to break up the moody atmosphere of the painting.The figure is depicted within her own home and is unaware of the gaze of the viewer, and her nudity serves in creating a portrait of natural comfort with the body away from prying eyes.

== Creation ==
Mckinney originally trained and worked as a photographer, which is evident in her painting practice. Like Mckinney’s candid photography, Reading Room depicts a fleeting moment in time. Mckinney began with a canvas covered in black gesso and built the figure and scene from the dark canvas, Mckinney compares the particular painting process with developing a dark photograph to bring out light. McKinney's decision to utilize paint as her chosen medium stems from her belief in its unparalleled capacity for conveying emotions and ideas transcending the confines of the tangible realm. Mckinney created a work featuring a Black female figure at rest, as it is an image largely absent from the canon of Western painting. Traditional figure painting rarely depicts Black women, and Mckinney sought to portray a Black woman in a classical setting. Mckinney utilized photographs from websites, social media, and vintage magazines as the source material for her painting, one from which the model is drawn and several others for the setting.While the model is not necessarily Black, Mckinney transforms her into a Black woman. However, Mckinney’s figure does not represent a particular person, instead she intends for the viewers to universally identify with the humanity of the figure. The exhibition title Golden Hour refers to the still and solitary time before the morning begins, Mckinney believes the time of day is majestic and moody, with characteristic lighting that becomes another figure in the painting.

== Ideology ==
The physical interior of the space serves as a representation of the interior of the mind. The mood of the physical interior reflects the emotional state of the depicted figure.

Mckinney seeks to build a restorative space for Black female leisure. Mckinney states that she had never seen a Black woman portrayed at leisure in paintings. Traditional depictions of Black women in the domestic sphere show them performing labor in the homes of others. Mckinney presents another way for Black women to exist in beauty and rest, as they are depicted at peace within their own homes, creating a sense of agency and safety. Despite the absence of explicit references to Black history or racial inequality, the artwork carries significant weight in reshaping perceptions of Black women, intervening on the historically wrought relationship between Black women and domestic space through the depiction of the mundane and the figure’s absence of activity, as depictions of boredom are rare and only reserved for white people.

Mckinney’s depiction of a figure at rest interrogates the rapid pace of the contemporary world. The artwork advocates for rest and the agency found in the choice to cease activity.

The portrayal of female rest is often associated with themes of sexuality. Mckinney’s depiction of nudity communicates vulnerability and personal autonomy through a private moment of repose rather than seduction. For black female nude figures, their portrayal is doubly fetishized due to the intersection of race and gender, inviting the male heterosexual gaze to sexualize and position the figure as “other”. Mckinney instead invites the viewer to become the figure and relate to it rather than exclusively acting as a observer.

== Influences ==
Mckinney is influenced by various sources. The use of “Caravaggesque” lighting as noted by Rebecca Schiffman of Art & Object references the inspiration that the artist draws from Caravaggio as well as the Spanish Golden Age of painting. The Baroque element extends to the artist's practice, as she likens the black canvas that she paints from to the burnt umber base utilized by the Old Masters. The artist cites 1970s photography, the quiet complexity found in the portraiture of Barkley Hendricks, and the depiction of figures in interiors by Jacob Lawrence as additional influences.
