= Latham (surname) =

Latham (pronounced 'lay-thm') is an Old Scandinavian surname.

== Origins and variants ==
The surname may derive from a place called "Latham". The word is related to a "(place of or by) the barns" and “builders of fences”related to the Old Norse hlatha, barn. Lathom in Lancashire is recorded as "Latune" in the Domesday Book of 1086 which is related to the region of Latium, and in the 1201 Pipe Rolls of the county as "Lathum". "Laytham" in East Yorkshire appears as "Ladone" in the Domesday Book. Locational surnames were usually acquired by those former inhabitants of a place who moved to another area, and were thereafter best identified by the name of their birthplace. The modern surname can found as "Latham", "Lathom", "Laytham", "Leatham", "Lathem", "Latam", "Leedham", "Lazom", and "Lazem". The first recorded spelling of the surname is shown to be that of Robert de Latham (witness), which was dated 1204, in the "Yorkshire Assize Court Rolls", during the reign of King John, known as "Lackland", 1199–1216.

== People with the surname ==
- Aaron Latham (1943–2022), American journalist
- A. J. H. Latham (born 1940), British economic historian
- Ann Latham (1772–1835), British entomologist, scientific illustrator and watercolourist
- Arabella Latham (born 1997), South African singer and songwriter, known professionally as Baby Queen
- Arlie Latham (1860–1952), American baseball player
- Arthur Latham (footballer) (1863–1928), British footballer
- Arthur Latham (1930–2016), British politician
- Bill Latham (basketball) (born 1989), Australian wheelchair basketball player
- Cassandra Latham (fl. 1980s), British witch
- Cathy Latham, American teacher and political activist
- Charles Latham (1816–1907), English physician and surgeon
- Charles Latham (photographer) (1847–1912), English photographer
- Charles Latham (1882–1968), Australian politician
- Charles Latham, 1st Baron Latham (1888–1970), British politician
- Chris Latham (baseball) (born 1973), American baseball player
- Chris Latham (rugby union) (born 1975), Australian rugby union player
- Christine Latham (born 1981), Canadian soccer player
- Christopher Latham (born 1994), British cyclist
- Sir David Latham (born 1942), British judge
- Ella Latham (1878–1964), Australian charity worker and hospital administrator
- Frances Latham (1610–1677), American colonial settler
- George Latham (architect) (died 1871), British architect
- George R. Latham (1832–1917), American politician, lawyer and farmer
- George William Latham (1827–1886), English landowner, barrister and Liberal politician
- Harold Latham (1887–1969), American editor
- Harry Latham (1921–1983), English footballer
- Helen Latham (born 1976), British actress
- Henry Latham (1821–1902), British academic and priest
- Henry J. Latham (1908–2002), American politician, attorney and jurist
- Hubert Latham (1883–1912), French aviator
- Hubert Latham (English cricketer), (1932–2017)
- Jah-Marien Latham (born 2002), American football player
- James Latham (criminal) (1942–1965), American serial killer
- James Latham (painter) (c. 1696 – 1747), Irish painter
- Jane Leeke Latham (1867–1938), British teacher and missionary
- JC Latham (born 2003), American football player
- Jean Lee Latham (1902–1995), American writer
- Jody Latham (born 1983), English actor
- John Cridland Latham (1888–1975), American soldier
- John Latham (1761–1843), English physician, President of the Royal College of Physicians
- John Latham (1787–1853), English poet
- John Latham (artist) (1921–2006), British conceptual artist
- John Latham (judge) (1877–1964), Australian lawyer, politician, and the fifth Chief Justice of Australia
- John Latham (ornithologist) (1740–1837), British ornithologist
- Juice Latham (1852–1914), American baseball player and manager
- Karen Latham, American painter
- Lance Latham (1894–1985), American evangelist and musician
- Larry Latham (1952–2003), American wrestler
- Larry Latham (animator) (1953–2014), American animator and artist
- Laurie Latham (born 1955), British record producer
- Lonnie Latham (born 1946), American Baptist pastor
- Louis C. Latham (1840–1895), American politician
- Louise Latham (1922–2018), American actress
- Lynn Marie Latham, American TV writer and producer
- Lynne Latham (born 1948), American actress and dancer
- Mark Latham (born 1961), Australian politician and media commentator
- Michael Latham (1942–2017), British politician
- Mike Latham (born 1939), English cricketer
- Milton Latham (1827–1882), US Senator and Governor of California
- Patrick Latham (born 1975), English cricketer
- Paul Latham (1905–1955), British politician
- Pauline Latham (born 1948), British politician
- Peter Latham (RAF officer) (1925–2016), British air marshal
- Peter Latham (tennis) (1865–1953), British racquets and real tennis player
- Peter Wallwork Latham (1832–1923), English physician and professor of medicine
- Philip Latham (1929–2020), British actor
- Philip Latham, pen name of Robert S. Richardson (1902–1981), American astronomer
- R. E. Latham (1907–1992), English classicist
- Richard Latham (1908–1953), Brazilian cricketer
- Rob Latham, American professor and literary critic
- Robert Latham (editor) (1912–1995), English co-editor of the diary of Samuel Pepys
- Robert Gordon Latham (1812–1888), British ethnologist
- Rod Latham (born 1961), New Zealand cricketer
- Simon Latham (fl. 1618), English writer on falconry
- Thomas Latham (cricketer) (1847–1926), English barrister and cricketer
- Thomas J. Latham (1831–1911), American lawyer and businessman
- Tim Latham (born 1966), American recording engineer
- Tom Latham (cricketer) (born 1992), New Zealand cricketer
- Tom Latham (politician) (born 1948), American politician
- Vida Latham (1866–1958), British-American physician
- Walter Latham (born 1970), American actor and producer
- William Latham (computer scientist) (born 1961), British computer artist
- William H. Latham (1903–1987), American engineer
- William P. Latham (1917–2004), American composer
- Woodville Latham (1837–1911), American inventor

== Middle name ==
- Christopher Latham Sholes (1819–1890), American publisher, politician and inventor
- Edward Latham Ormerod (1819–1873), English physician
- Henrietta Latham Dwight (1840–1909), American artist and writer
- Jan Latham-Koenig (born 1953), British conductor

== See also ==
- Baron Latham, a title in the Peerage of the United Kingdom
