= Leatham =

Leatham is a surname and given name. Notable people with the name include:

== As a surname ==
- Albert Leatham (1859–1948), English cricketer
- Bob Leatham (c. 1925–1996), Canadian football player
- Edward Leatham (1828–1900), English Liberal Member of Parliament
- George Leatham (1849–1916), Australian politician
- Gerald Leatham (1851–1932), English amateur first-class cricketer
- John Leatham (born 1946), former Australian rules footballer
- Lady Victoria Leatham (born 1947), antiques expert and television personality
- Ralph Leatham KCB (1888–1954), Royal Navy officer, Commander-in-Chief, Plymouth during World War II
- Rob Leatham (born 1961), also known as "TGO", professional shooter
- William Henry Leatham (1815–1889), British banker, poet and Liberal politician
- William Leatham (banker) (1785–1842), leading Banker in Wakefield, a Quaker and an abolitionist

== As a given name ==
- William Leatham Bright (1851–1910), English Liberal politician
- Robert Leatham Simpson (1915–2003), general authority of The LDS Church from 1961 until his death

== See also ==
- Kirk Leatham, a village in North Yorkshire, England
- Leatham River, river of the Marlborough Region of New Zealand's South Island
- Leatham D. Smith Shipbuilding Company, a shipyard and dry dock company in Sturgeon Bay, Door County, Wisconsin
- Latham (disambiguation)
- Leath
- Letham (disambiguation)
- Upleatham
