= William Latham =

William Latham may refer to:

- William Latham (pilgrim) (1608-1651), Pilgrim and Mayflower passenger
- William Latham (computer scientist) (born 1961), British computer artist
- William P. Latham (1917–2004), American composer
- William H. Latham (1903–1987), engineer with the New York Power Authority
- William H. Latham (icebreaker), a 1987 icebreaker on the Niagara River, named after the above

== See also ==
- Bill Latham (disambiguation)
