= Leathem =

Leathem is a surname. Notable people with the name include:

- Andy Leathem (born 1977), English professional rugby league footballer
- Bob Leathem (1925–1996), Canadian football player
- Janet Leathem, New Zealand psychology academic specializing in traumatic brain injury
- John Leathem, murderer

== See also ==
- Leathem D. Smith Shipbuilding Co., shipyard and dry dock company in Sturgeon Bay, Door County, Wisconsin, US
- Quinn v Leathem, important case historically for British labour law
