= Maid of the Mist =

Sightseeing boat tour of Niagara Falls

Coordinates: 43.0865°N 79.0679°W

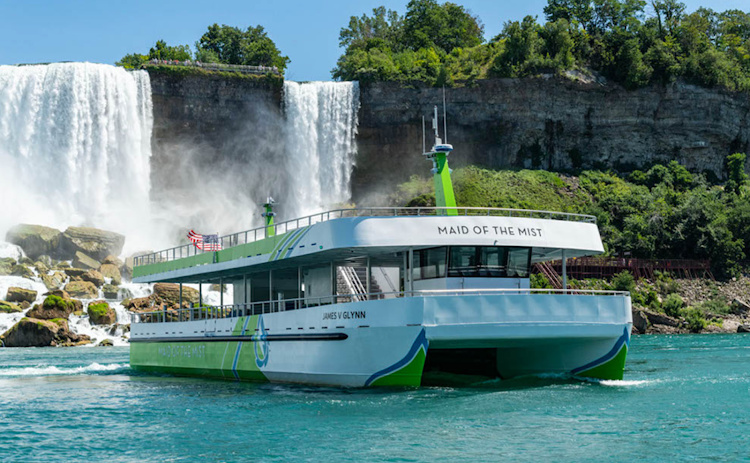
- The James V. Glynn is one of two all-electric Maid of the Mist vessels.

History
- In service: 1846-present

General characteristics
- Length: 90 feet (27 m)
- Depth: 6 feet (1.8 m)
- Propulsion: Lithium-ion battery packs power the all-electric motor

The Maid of the Mist is a sightseeing boat tour of Niagara Falls, New York, US. The tour starts and ends on the American side of the falls, crossing briefly into Canada during a portion of the trip.

James V. Glynn was chairman and chief executive officer of Maid of the Mist Corp. He joined Maid of the Mist in 1950 as a ticket seller and purchased the company in 1971. He died in 2025.

There have been sightseeing boats at Niagara since 1846. Steam-powered boats were replaced by diesel-powered craft in 1955. All were named Maid of the Mist until 2020, when company president Christopher M. Glynn introduced two new boats powered by lithium-ion battery-powered electric motors; these were named James V. Glynn, after the CEO; and Nikola Tesla, for the engineer who developed a type of alternating current (AC) motor. Tesla's patents were licensed by George Westinghouse, whose company later won the bid to build the first AC power plant at Niagara Falls.

The name, Maid of the Mist, could be a reference to the Iroquois myth of Lelawala.

== History ==
=== The United States ===
The original Maid of the Mist was built at a landing near Niagara Falls on the American side of the border. The boat was christened in 1846 as a border-crossing ferry; its first trip was on September 18, 1846. The two-stage barge-like steamer was designed primarily as a link for a proposed ferry service between New York City and Toronto. It was a 72-foot (22 m)-long side-wheeler with an 18-foot (5.5 m) beam which was powered by steam produced from a wood- and coal-fired boiler. It could carry up to 100 passengers.

The ferry did well until 1848, when the opening of a suspension bridge between the US and Canada cut into the ferry traffic. It was then that the owners decided to make the journey a sightseeing trip, plotting a journey closer to the Falls.

The present day Maid of the Mist Corporation was formed in 1884 by Captain R. F. Carter and Frank LaBlond, who invested in a new Maid that would launch in 1885. Captain Carter and Mr. LaBlond hired Alfred H. White from Port Robinson, Ontario, to build the new ship. A letter in the archives of the Buffalo Historical Society from Mr. LaBlond to Alfred White says that they are well pleased with the vessel and asks Alfred to add a wale onto the boat.

The service is run by Maid of the Mist Corp. of Niagara Falls, New York. Maid of the Mist has been owned by the Glynn family since 1971. Under the leadership of James V. Glenn, the operation expanded significantly, including the construction of seven new vessels.

=== Canada ===
Access to the river-level attraction on the Canadian side was provided by the Maid of the Mist Incline Railway, a funicular railway, between 1894 and 1990, to travel between street level and the boat dock. As this service proved increasingly inadequate in transporting the growing passenger base of the 1990s, four high-speed elevators replaced the railway in 1991. On the American side, the dock is reached by four elevators enclosed in the observation tower.

The Russel Brothers of Owen Sound, Ontario, made two all-steel Maids for the Niagara Falls Gorge, in 1955 and 1956. The first one is now based in Parry Sound, Ontario, and runs dinner cruises and day excursions. The second Maid was sold in 1983 to the United Pentecostal Church of Ontario and destined for missionary service in the Amazon. Maid of the Mist II took part in the July 9, 1960, rescue of Roger Woodward, a seven-year-old boy who became the first person to survive a plunge over the Horseshoe Falls with nothing but a life jacket. Maid of the Mist II served as a Maid of the Mist until 1983. Subsequently she was relocated to the Amazon River, where she served as a missionary ship for some years.

A partial history of Maid of the Mist is featured in the IMAX film Niagara: Miracles, Myths and Magic.

== Notable passengers ==
While on his 1860 tour of Canada, Albert Edward, Prince of Wales (later King Edward VII), rode on Maid of the Mist.

June 1952: Jean Peters rode the Maid of the Mist while in Niagara Falls to film the movie, Niagara.

Mikhail Gorbachev was a passenger in 1983.

1991: Prince Charles and Princess Diana, and their two young sons, Princes William and Harry, rode on Maid of the Mist.

1996: Former U.S. President Jimmy Carter was a passenger, escorted by James V. Glynn.

2003: BBC Scotland's popular comedy sitcom Still Game made mention of the Maid of the Mist when lead characters Jack and Victor visited the former's family in Canada, and Victor takes Jack's grandson's aboard off screen.

2003: Maid of the Mist was featured in a scene of the movie Bruce Almighty, where Jim Carrey's character Bruce Nolan, a news anchor, has a mental breakdown after being told over his earpiece that his rival was given a promotion he himself was eyeing.

2009: NBC-TV's popular sit-com The Office filmed scenes on Maid of the Mist. The episode centered on the wedding of the characters Jim and Pam.

2018: ESPN's Monday Night Countdown recorded a segment before a Buffalo Bills game.

2020: NFL great DeMarcus Ware and a crew from NFL Films were onboard James V. Glynn in 2020 ahead of the Buffalo Bills - New England Patriots game.

2022: Maid of the Mist was featured in the 2022 motion picture A Man Called Otto, starring Tom Hanks.

== Boats ==
=== Original ships ===
The first series boats to bear the "Maid of the Mist" moniker were steam-powered wooden-hulled ferries. These were in use until an early-season fire destroyed the last of them in 1955.

First Maid of the Mist

- Years of service: 1846–1854
- Type: double-stack steamboat ferry
- Engine: one sidewheel steam

Second Maid of the Mist

- Years of service: 1854–1860
- Length: 72 feet (22 m)
- Type: single-stack steamer
- Engine: paddle boat

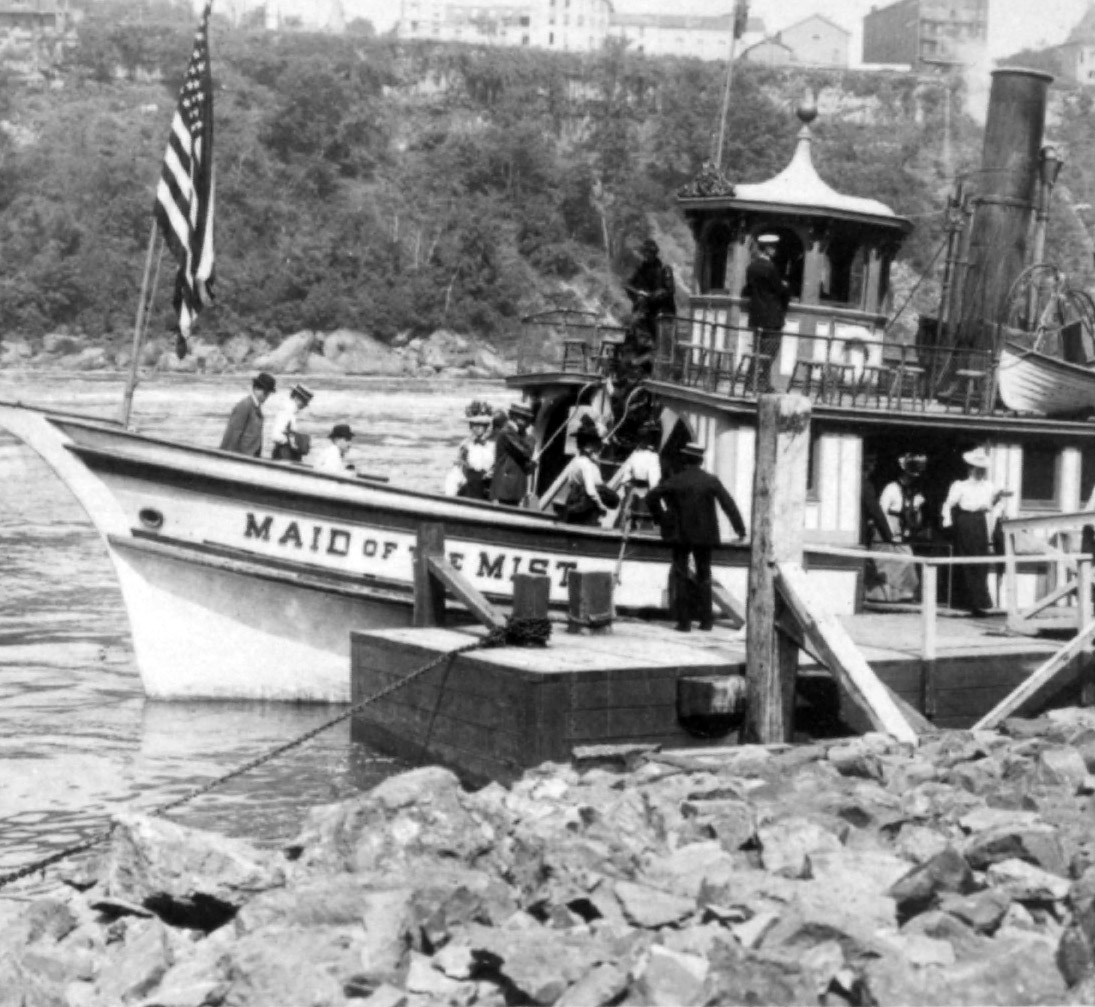
Maid of the Mist I, published c. 1901

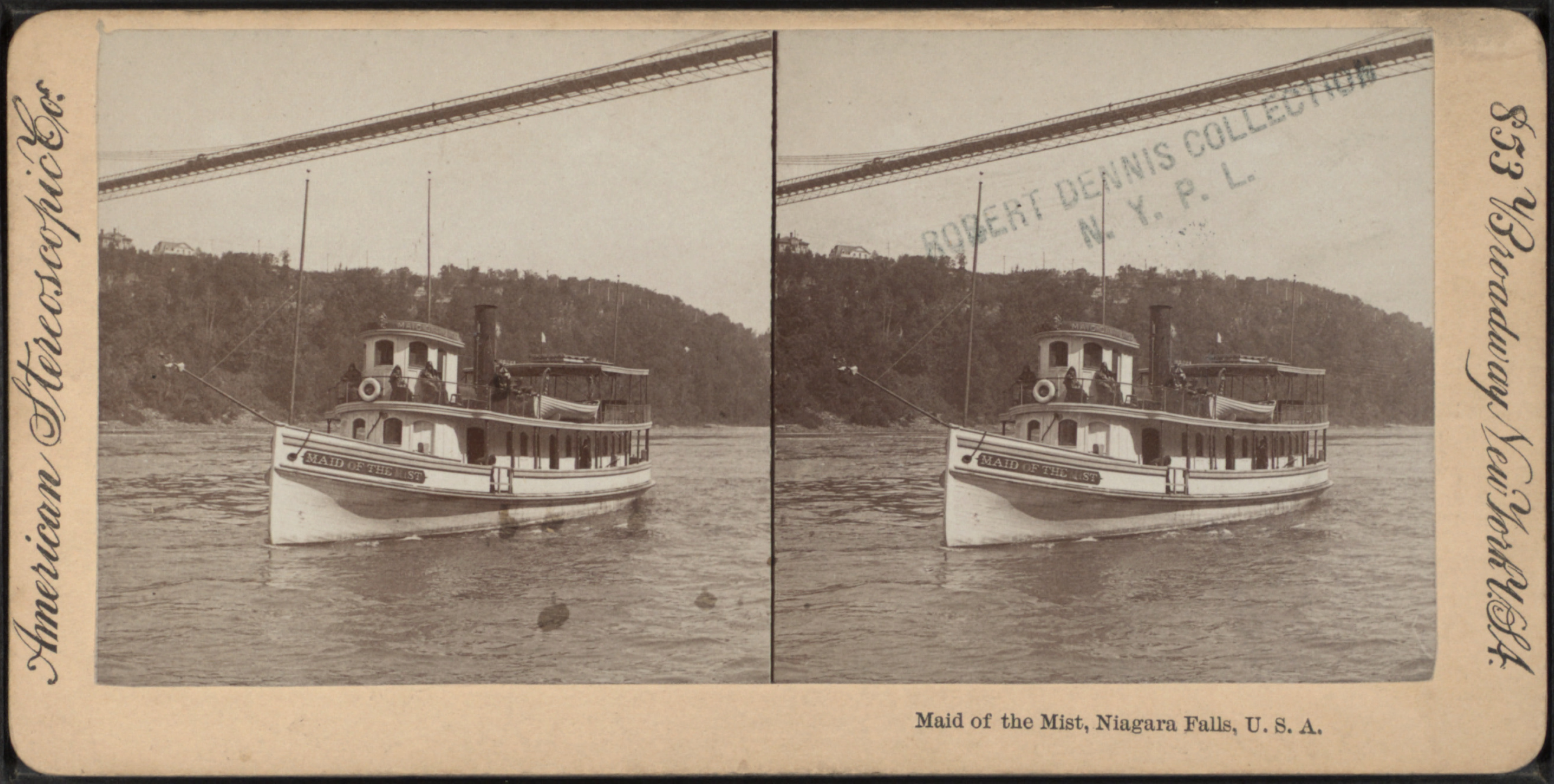
Stereoscopic view of Maid of the Mist II, c. 1896–1906

Third Maid of the Mist

- Years of service: 1885–1955
- Type: steam boat

Fourth Maid of the Mist

- Years of service: 1892–1955
- Type: white oak steamboat
- Length: 89 feet (27 m)
- Engine: two-engine steam

=== Diesel vessels ===
After a fire destroyed the last of the wooden-hulled steamers, they were replaced by steel-hulled, diesel-powered ferries, launched in 1955 and 1956. About every 20 years or so, new ships were added to the fleet, of increasingly larger capacity; the initial Maid of the Mist held only 101 passengers, while the last of the diesel-powered vessels, Maid of the Mist VII, could hold up to 600. The last of these were retired in 2019, to be replaced by electric-powered vessels that can hold 600 passengers.

Maid of the Mist I

- Years of service: 1955–1990
- Length: 66 feet (20 m)
- Engine: 200-horsepower (150 kW) diesel engines
- Passengers: 101

Maid of the Mist II

- Years of service: 1956–1983
- Type: all-steel boat, twin of I
- Engine: 200-horsepower (150 kW) diesel engines
- Passengers: 101

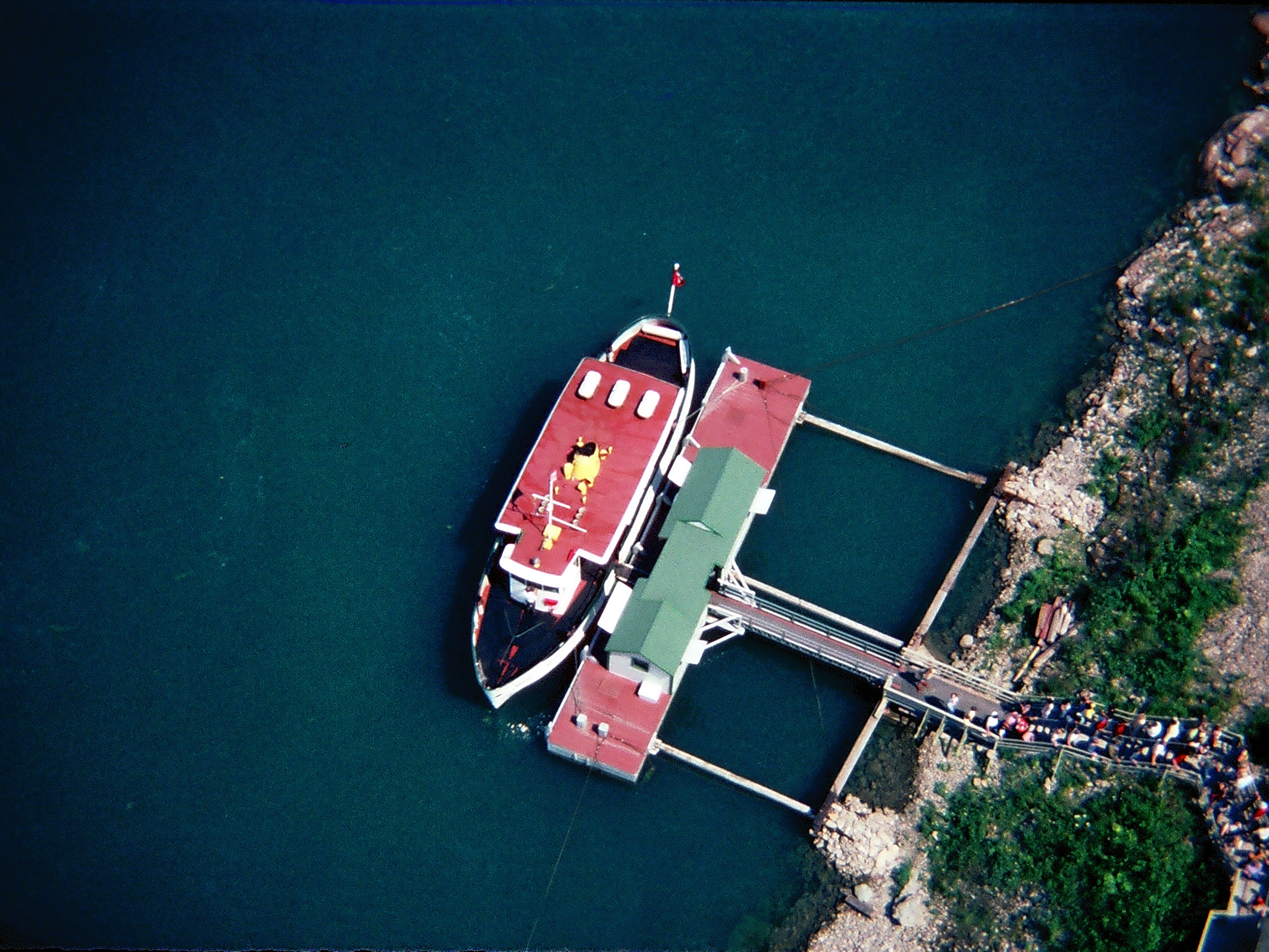
Maid of the Mist boarding dock, 1976

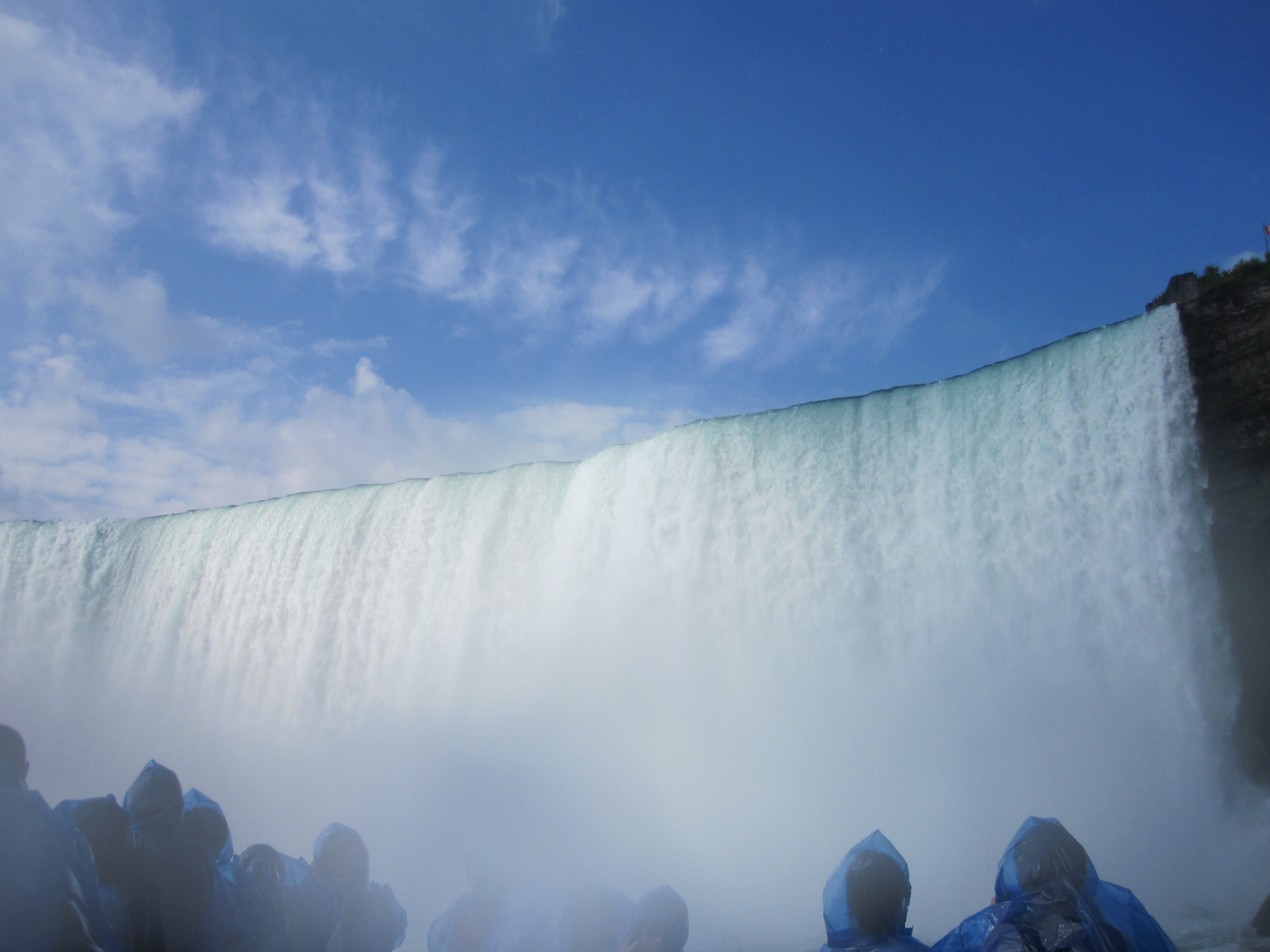
View of Niagara Falls from Maid of the Mist

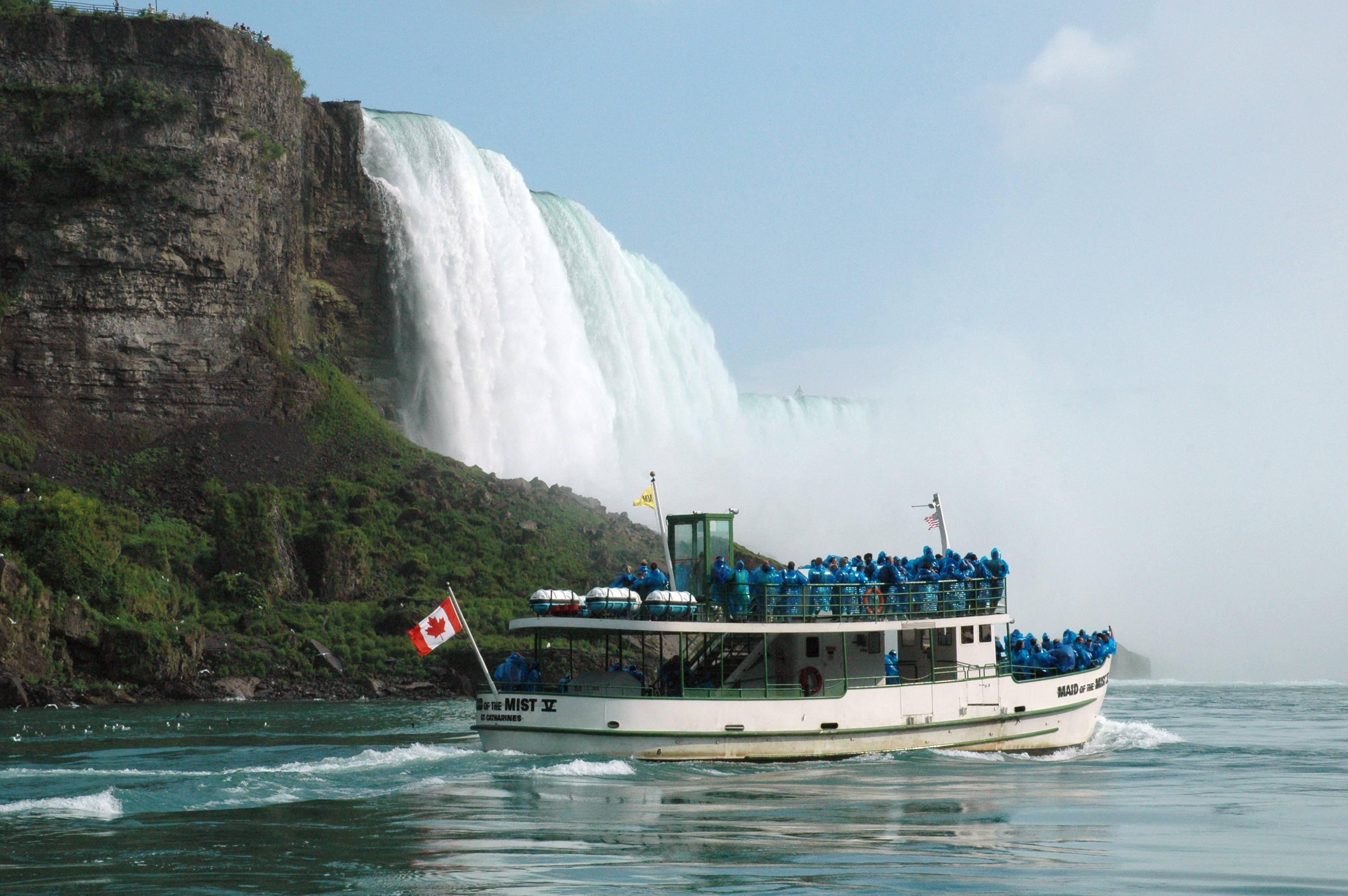
Maid of the Mist V, 2007

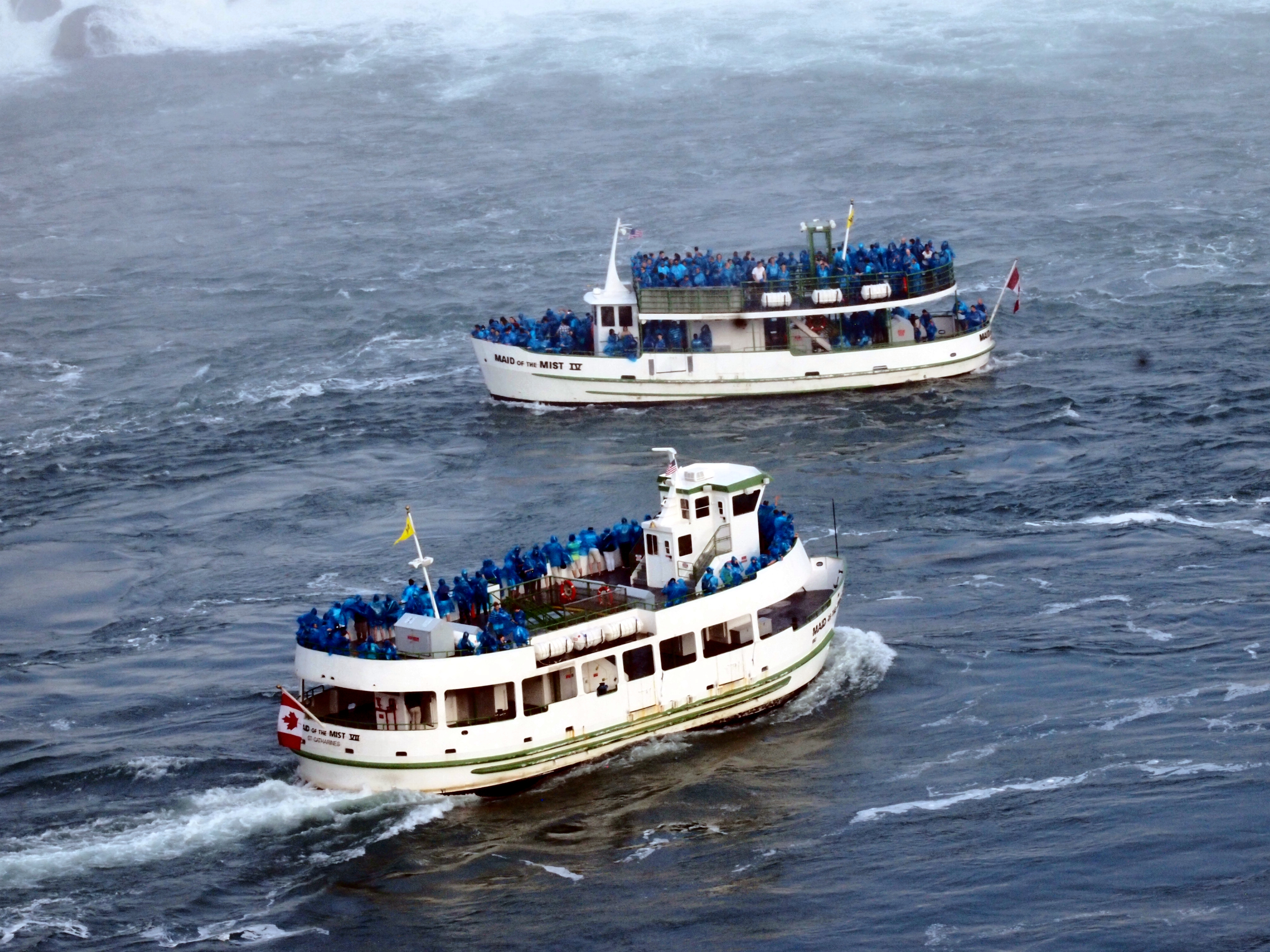
Maid of Mist IV and Maid of Mist VII

Maid of the Mist III

- Years of service: 1972–1997
- Length: 65 feet (20 m)
- Gross tonnage: 75
- Engine: single 250-horsepower (190 kW) diesel
- Passengers: 210

Maid of the Mist IV

- Years of service: 1976–2013
- Length: 72 feet (22 m)
- Gross tonnage: 75
- Engine: two 250-horsepower (190 kW) diesel
- Passengers: 300

Maid of the Mist V

- Years of service: 1983–2013
- Length: 72 feet (22 m)
- Gross tonnage: 74
- Engine: two 355-horsepower (265 kW) diesel
- Passengers: 300

Maid of the Mist VI

- Years of service: 1990–2019
- Length: 74 feet (23 m)
- Breadth: 30 feet (9.1 m)
- Depth: 10 feet (3.0 m)
- Gross tonnage: 155
- Engine: two 355-horsepower (265 kW) diesel
- Passengers: 600

Maid of the Mist VII

- Years of service: 1997–2020
- Length: 80 feet (24 m)
- Breadth: 30 feet (9.1 m)
- Depth: 10 feet (3.0 m)
- Gross tonnage: 155
- Engine: two 350-horsepower (260 kW) diesel
- Passengers: 600

=== Electric vessels ===
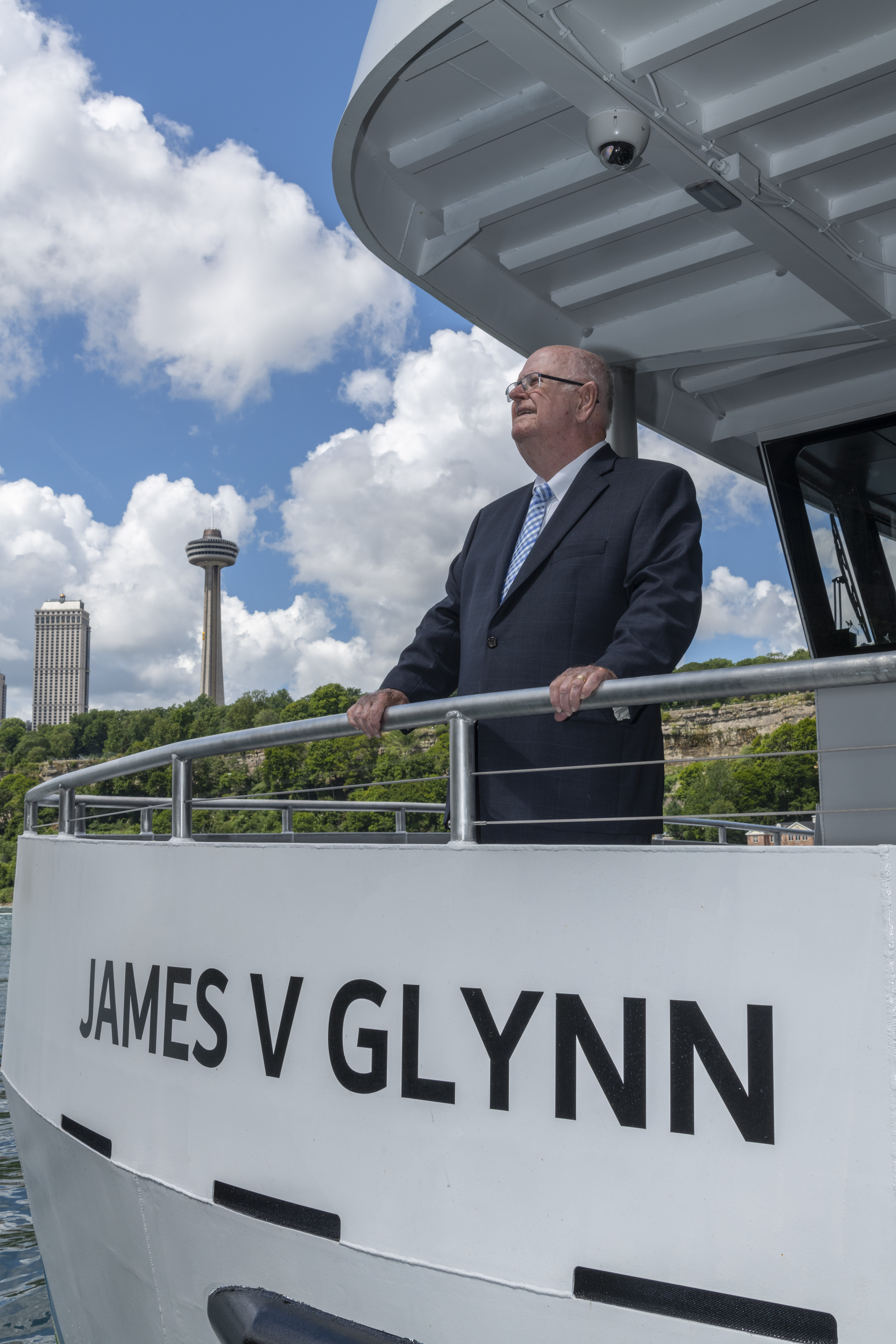

Beginning with the 2020 season, the Maid of the Mist launched two all-new electric ships, with a similar size and capacity to the prior diesel-powered ones.

James V. Glynn

- Years of service: 2020–present
- Length: 90 feet (27 m)
- Breadth: 34 feet (10 m)
- Depth: 6 feet (1.8 m)
- Propulsion system: lithium-ion battery packs power the all-electric motor
- Passengers: 600

Nikola Tesla

- Years of service: 2020–present
- Length: 90 feet (27 m)
- Breadth: 34 feet (10 m)
- Depth: 6 feet (1.8 m)
- Propulsion system: lithium-ion battery packs power the all-electric motor
- Passengers: 600

== See also ==
- Niagara Queen II
- William H. Latham (icebreaker)
