= Bill Latham =

Bill Latham may refer to:

- Bill Latham (baseball) (born 1960), former Major League Baseball pitcher
- Bill Latham (basketball) (born 1989), wheelchair basketball player from Australia
- Bill Latham (footballer) (1907–1994), Australian footballer

== See also ==
- William Latham (disambiguation)
