= Latham =

Latham may refer to:

== Places ==
=== Australia ===
- Latham, Australian Capital Territory, a suburb of Canberra, Australia
- Latham, Western Australia

=== Tanzania ===
- Latham Island

=== United States ===
- Latham, Illinois, a small town
- Latham, Kansas, a small town
- Latham, New York, a hamlet in Colonie (town), New York and a suburb of Albany, New York
- Latham, Ohio, an unincorporated community
- Latham, Missouri, an unincorporated community
- Latham, Oregon, an unincorporated community
- Latham, Tennessee, an unincorporated community
- Latham Shale, California, a geologic formation
- Latham Square, a prominent downtown intersection in Oakland, California
- Latham, Massachusetts, the fictional setting for the final episode of Seinfeld

== Companies ==
- Latham & Watkins, a global law firm
- Société Latham, a French aeronautical construction company

== Other uses ==
- Latham (surname)
- The Latham Diaries, a memoir about politics in Australia
- Latham, a cultivar of raspberry with some resistance to raspberry spur blight
- Latham 47, a French twin-engine flying boat
- a 1906 hotel in Manhattan, New York City, designed by Augustus N. Allen

== See also ==
- Lathom, a village in Lancashire, England, United Kingdom
