= William Hammond (died 1685) =

English gentleman and Grand Tourist

William Hammond (c.1635 – c.1685) was an English gentleman and Grand Tourist. He has been identified since 1792 as the William Hammond who was an original Fellow of the Royal Society.

== Background ==
The Hammond family had been established Kent landowners since 1551. In the 1550s the monastic property that became St Alban's Court, at Nonington, was bought by Thomas Hammond. The name was because of its previous association with St Albans Abbey in Hertfordshire. On the Dissolution of the Monasteries it had come to Christopher Hales; via his heiresses to Alexander Culpepper of Bedgebury; and a member of the Culpepper family had sold it on to Thomas Hammond. Sir William Hammond (1579–1615) was the grandson of Thomas Hammond.

=== Anthony Hammond (1608–1661) ===
Anthony Hammond of Wilburton (identified also as of St Albans's Court, Kent) was son of Sir William Hammond (1579–1615) of St Albans Court. William Hammond (born 1614) the poet was his brother. Their mother Elizabeth Archer or Aucher, daughter of Margaret Sandys, was the granddaughter of Edwin Sandys, Archbishop of York. Sir Miles Sandys, 1st Baronet was therefore his great-uncle. The main seat of Sir Miles Sandys was Wilburton. Elizabeth Aucher was sister of Sir Anthony Aucher, Member of Parliament (withdrawn) for Rochester.

Involved in the draining of the Fens, Anthony Hammond was an adventurer in the Bedford Level: he was one of those with shares in the original 1631 indenture (as "Anthony Hamond of St Albons in the Count of Kent, Esquire"). He had a supervisory role, in drainage work started from 1649 by Sir Miles Sandys, 2nd Baronet (died 1654) and others, under Cornelius Vermuyden, and was paid £20 per month. Superintendent of the South Level in 1654, he was replaced in that post by Samuel Fortrey, the following year. The Hammond's Eau drain is named after him.

Anthony Hammond married Anne Digges, daughter of Dudley Digges, and they had four sons: William, Anthony, Dudley and Edward and numerous daughters including Hester, Frances, and Jane. In 1661 he died at Wilburton. He has been credited as the author of The Gentleman's Exercise (1662) by A. H., a supplement to the falconry manual of Simon Latham.

The second son, Anthony Hammond, bought Somersham Place, a former episcopal palace of the bishops of Ely, around 1660; or leased a wing of what was a building falling to ruins. He died there in 1680. He was father of Anthony Hammond (1668–1738) the Member of Parliament, who was also a Conservator of the Bedford Level.

== Early life ==
William Hammond was the son of Anthony Hammond (1608–1661). He matriculated at Wadham College, Oxford in 1650. He corresponded with his parents at Wilburton (as Wilberton). He speculates at one point in a letter from Paris on taking a higher degree at Oxford, through John Wilkins; and mentions that his scientific library had been built around suggestions from Lawrence Rooke, Charles Scarburgh, Seth Ward and Christopher Wren. A potential career in medicine motivated Hammond's continental tour.

== Tour 1655 to 1658 ==
Hammond based his Tour around extended over-winter stays in Paris. In 1656 he went from there to Florence, returning via La Fleche. In 1657 he went to Lyon, Nîmes and Montpelier. In 1658 the route was Lyon, Florence, Paris; followed by Amsterdam, Germany and the Spanish Netherlands.

In a series of letters, most apparently surviving, Hammond wrote in detail to his parents about his travels. He had practical support, and an introduction to Sir Kenelm Digby, from Henry Holden in Paris, Holden being a good friend of Lady Mary Stanley, mother of Thomas Stanley and sister of Anthony Hammond, William's father. He carried out some research on French silk manufacturing, at the request of Edward Digges, his mother's brother. Jonas Moore, a family friend, sent Hammond a mathematical problem; he disclaimed any remaining competence in mathematics, and passed it to Digby to circulate among French mathematicians.

Hammond had a companion "Cosin Bowyer" for some of the way, able to lend him money, and "Heir of Camberwell". Following Brennan, this was a son of Sir Edmund Bowyer of Camberwell Green, who had married Hammond's great-aunt Hester Aucher, sister of Elizabeth Aucher. Sir Edmund's heir Anthony Bowyer, a future barrister and politician, matriculated at Christ Church, Oxford in 1651. Boywer fell ill with smallpox at Nîmes, and Hammond tended him there in September and October 1657. He commented on the banking of the River Rhône, compared to that used in the Fens.

== Later life ==
According to Alumni Oxonienses, he may be the William Hammond who entered Gray's Inn, in 1663. Hammond mentions his chamber, in Gray's Inn. William Hammond, Esq. occurs as an "Old Adventurer" in a petition to Charles II concerned with the Great Level of the Fens. John Collins commented in a 1677 letter to John Wallis that Hammond was a "great lover" of mathematics.

== Family ==
Hammond married, as her second husband, Elizabeth, daughter of Sir John Marsham, 1st Baronet. Marsham's wife Elizabeth was a sister of Anthony Hammond, his father, so this was a marriage of first cousins. The children of this marriage were three sons, one of whom died young, and two daughters: their daughter Anne married William Wotton, and Elizabeth married Oliver St John, son of Sir Oliver St John (died 1673), the judge. The eldest son William succeeded his father. By a second marriage Hammond had no children.

=== "Cosin Gabriell Richards" ===
A possible relative, Gabriel Richards, is mentioned in William Hammond's letters as a "cousin". Some unresolved issues remain about the putative family connection.

== William Hammond FRS ==
Hunter gives as definite information on William Hammond the Fellow of the Royal Society: the date of admission in 1661; the description "Kentish gentleman"; and activity in the Society to 1681. The suggestion that William Hammond FRS, of Kent, had travelled abroad as education for a future physician occurred in the 1792 Topographical Miscellanies of Samuel Egerton Brydges. His uncle the poet, also mentioned by Hunter, is thought to have died c.1655.

== Legacy ==
Hammond's letters from his tour survive in two copies. One set, which passed through the hands of Bruce Ingram, is in the Brotherton Collection of the University of Leeds. A second set was copied by an unknown person, placed only as a first cousin of Lady Elizabeth Lombe, wife of Sir Thomas Lombe, in the middle years of the 18th century. It is in the British Library.
