= Murder of Paige Doherty =

2016 murder case in Scotland

- Location: Clydebank, Scotland
- Date: 19 March 2016
- Attack type: Murder
- Weapon: Knife
- Victim: Paige Doherty
- Assailant: John Leathem
- Charges: Life imprisonment with a minimum term of 23 years at HMP Dumfries
- Verdict: Guilty
- Convictions: Murder

Paige Doherty
- Born: 17 April 2000; Scotland
- Died: 19 March 2016 (aged 15); Clydebank, West Dumbartonshire, Scotland
- Cause of death: Stabbing
- Parent(s): Pamela Doherty, Jon Bothwell

Paige Doherty was a 15-year-old student from Clydebank, Scotland, who was murdered on 19 March 2016 by 32-year-old John Leathem in his delicatessen.

== Background ==
Paige had stayed at her friend's house on the night of 18 March. On the 19th, at around 8:21am, she went to John Leathem's delicatessen. Normally she would have gone to her hairdressing job in Kirkintilloch, 12 mi (19 km) away. She failed to arrive, and the search for her began.

John Leathem
- Born: John Leathem; 1983 or 1984; Scotland
- Status: Incarcerated
- Criminal charge: Murder
- Penalty: Life imprisonment with a minimum term of 23 years

Details
- Date apprehended: 26 March 2016
- Imprisoned at: HMP Dumfries

== Murder investigation ==
Doherty's body was found by passers-by on the roadside near Glasgow's Great Western Road two days after she disappeared. She had been stabbed in the head and neck and suffered more than 250 wounds, though her mother, Pamela Doherty, claimed that there were more than 500 wounds. The last sighting of her was on CCTV at Leathem's shop; he later admitted to murdering Doherty. Her mother set up the charity, Paige's Promise, in Doherty's name to teach children self-defence, as well as support families whose children have been victims of murder.

== Trial ==
John Leathem claimed that Paige threatened to tell people that he had "touched her" inappropriately, if he refused to give her a job, because she was underage. The main evidence used in the trial was CCTV footage of Leathem closing the deli, running to the shop next door, and then returning with the deli remaining closed for about an hour. The footage then shows him putting a full bin bag in his trunk. The bag was confirmed to contain the body of Paige and when the owner of the shop he visited was questioned, it was confirmed that Leathem had purchased gloves, bleach and the bin bag.

== Sentencing ==
On 12 October 2016, seven months after Doherty's murder, Leathem was sentenced at the High Court in Glasgow, where judge Lady Rae set a minimum time of 27 years in jail before becoming eligible to apply for parole. However, in February 2017, following an appeal by Leathem, the minimum term was reduced to 23 years.

== See also ==
- List of solved missing person cases (post-2000)
- Murder of Karen Buckley
- Murder of Esther Brown
- Murder of Amanda Duffy
