= Vida Latham =

British-American dentist, physician, microscopist

Vida Annette Latham (1866–1958) was a British-American dentist, physician, microscopist, and researcher, known for her work in publishing and her research on oral tumors, surgery, and anatomy.

== Early life and education ==
Vida Latham was born in Lancashire in 1866 to a physician father. Her early education took place in Cambridge and Manchester. She earned her master's degree from the University of London in 1889; she published papers on tooth anatomy and pain in 1888 while working at a London dentist's office. She then moved to the United States because she could not practice in the UK with an American dentistry degree. She earned her DDS in 1892 from the University of Michigan, and her MD from Northwestern University in 1895.

== Career and research ==
While studying for her DDS, she was a demonstrator in comparative dental anatomy and pathological bacteriology as well as a museum curator. While studying for her MD, Latham was a secretary and lectured in stomatology and dental surgery at Northwestern, and in pharmacy. She served as an oral surgeon at the Women's and Children's hospital from 1892 to 1897. Concurrently, she was on the faculty of the American Dental College, though she held this position until 1898. Latham was a member of Chicago's College of Physicians and Surgeons in 1902. She joined the Illinois State Dental Society in 1918 and became a lifelong member. From 1929 to 1931 she was an attending physician at Edgewater Hospital in Chicago, where she spent the rest of her career from 1929 on as a microanalyst and physician.

Latham was also a prolific journal and book editor, including the Medical Woman's Journal, the Polk Dental Dictionary, and the Standard Medical Dictionary. She researched throughout her career on oral surgery, operative dentistry, the neural anatomy of the jaw and teeth, palate tumors, oral cavity cysts, facial fractures, lead poisoning, aniline dyes, specimen preparation, blood tests for diabetes, the vasomotor system of teeth, and neoplasms of the tooth pulp.

She spent her career advocating for a more rigorous dentistry curriculum and for women in both dentistry and medicine.

== Honors and professional memberships ==
- Stomatological Society – member
- American Microscopical Society – member
- American Medical Association – fellow
- American Dental Association – member
- Microscopical Society – vice-president/public health secretary (1905)
- Society of Parasitology – member
- Illinois Microscopic Society – secretary (1893)/president (1932)
- New York Academy – member
- Women's Medical Club – Chicago chapter, vice president (1931)/president (1933)
- Women's Dental Association – president
- Royal Microscopical Society – fellow
- Manchester Microscopic Society – corresponding member
- Quekett Microscopical Club – fellow
- Victoria Microscopical Society – member
- International Stomatological Association – member

== Selected articles ==
- The Use of Stains, Especially with Reference to Their Value for Differential Diagnosis (1891)
- A Brief Account of the Microscopial Anatomy in a Case of Chrome Lead Poisoning (1891)
- A Plea for the Study of Re-Agents in Micro Work (1894)
- What is the Best Method of Teaching Microscopical Science in Medical Schools? (1897)
- A Plea for Symposium Work. Pondlife and New Methods of Narcotizing Polyzoa Rotifera (1909)
- Suggestions for Amateur Microscopists (1912)
