= Bill Latham (footballer) =

Australian rules footballer, born 1907

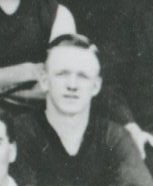

Personal information
- Full name: Bill Latham
- Born: 4 March 1907
- Died: 1 January 1994 (aged 86)
- Original team: Malvern

Playing career^{1}
Years	Club	Games (Goals)
1927–28	Melbourne	9 (0)
- ^{1} Playing statistics correct to the end of 1928.

Bill Latham (4 March 1907 – 1 January 1994) was an Australian rules footballer who played with Melbourne in the Victorian Football League (VFL).
