= Niagara Queen II =

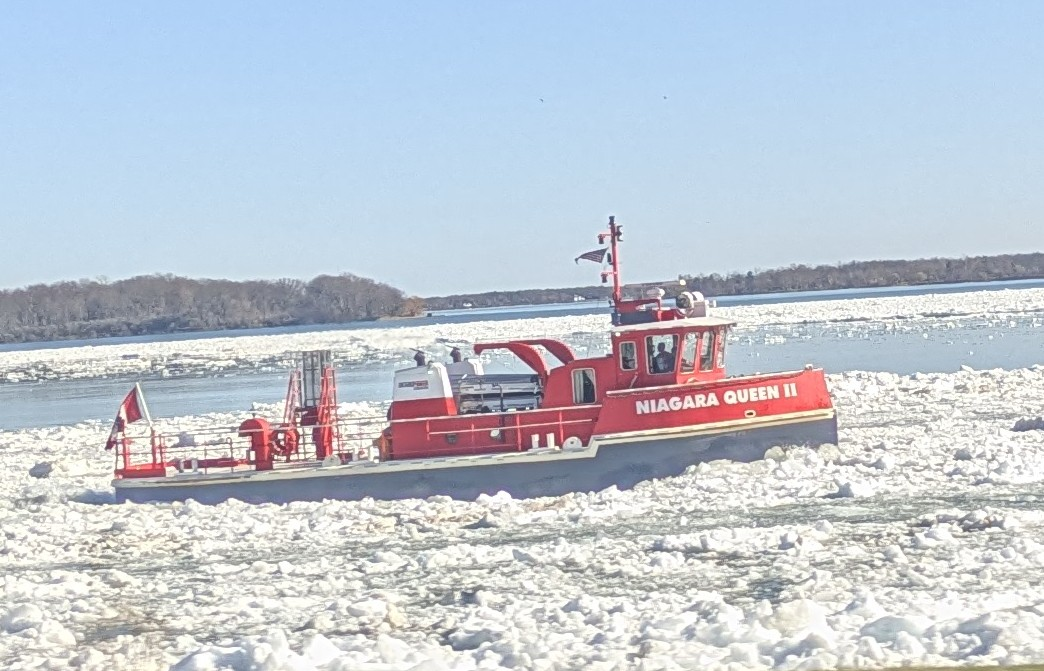

History
- Operator: Ontario Hydro
- Builder: Hike Metals & Shipbuilding Limited, Wheatley, Ontario, Canada
- Yard number: 815413
- Commissioned: 1992
- Status: in active service

General characteristics
- Type: Icebreaker
- Displacement: 85 tonnes (93.70 short tons)
- Length: 26.8 metres (88 ft)
- Beam: 5.5 metres (18 ft)
- Draft: 1.9 metres (6.2 ft)
- Depth: 2.9 metres (9.5 ft)
- Installed power: 1,280 kilowatts (1,720 shp)
- Speed: 10 kn (19 km/h)
- Crew: 6

Niagara Queen II is a small icebreaker that Ontario Power Generation uses to keep the inlet ports open at their plant on the Niagara River at Niagara Falls.

Niagara Queen II is a shallow draft river vessel designed by OPG and STX Marine. She replaced the Niagara Queen, a modified tugboat icebreaker operated by Ontario Hydro and now with OPG.

== See also ==
- William H. Latham (icebreaker) - a similar (but larger) vessel used by the New York Power Authority.
