= Harry Latham =

English footballer

Personal information
- Full name: Harry Latham
- Date of birth: 9 January 1921
- Place of birth: Sheffield, England
- Date of death: 25 July 1983 (aged 62)
- Place of death: Rotherham, England
- Height: 5 ft 11 in (1.80 m)
- Position: Defender

Youth career
- Brightside and Carbrook Co-Op

Senior career*
Years	Team	Apps	(Gls)
1937–1953	Sheffield United	190	(1)
1941	→ Chesterfield (guest)		
- * Club domestic league appearances and goals

Harry Latham (9 January 1921 – 25 July 1983) was an English footballer who played as a defender.

Born in Sheffield, Latham played as a youth for local side Brightside and Carbrook Co-Op before being spotted by Sheffield United. The Blades signed Latham as an amateur in October 1937 and he played regularly in the reserves until turning professional a year later. The Onset of World War II interrupted Latham's development but as he worked as a furnaceman in Sheffield's steel works, a reserved occupation, he was able to continue to play for United and was a regular starter at left-back during the war years. Latham also made one appearance as a guest player for Chesterfield in 1941 when they found themselves short of players for a fixture.

After the cessation of hostilities, Latham was moved to centre-back as United resumed league football. Although never considered an outstanding player, Latham was a respected presence in the dressing room and was named captain for the 1951–52 season. Latham had lost his best playing years to the war however, and the 1952–53 season proved to be his last, although he did help United to becoming Second Division champions that term. Latham had played 219 competitive games for United, scoring one goal, but had also played a further 203 fixtures during the war years.

After retiring from playing Latham took up a position of assistant coach for United's reserves in 1953, and moved to the same role with the first team in 1956. Latham lacked confidence and refused to attend coaching courses however, and despite remaining with the club until 1974, his coaching career never progressed.
