= HM Prison Dumfries =

Prison in Dumfries and Galloway, Scotland

Coordinates: 55.0682°N 3.62566°W

HMP Dumfries
- Interactive map of HMP Dumfries
- Location: Dumfries, Dumfries and Galloway
- Status: Operational
- Capacity: 200 (February 2009)
- Managed by: Scottish Prison Service
- Governor: Andrew Hunstone

HM Prison Dumfries services the courts of Dumfries and Galloway and across Scotland. The establishment serves as a local community prison that holds adult and under 21 males who are remanded in custody for trial and those convicted but remanded for reports. HMP Dumfries is also a national facility for up to 135 long‑term and short‑term men who require to be separated from mainstream prisoners (offence related protection prisoners). These have included disgraced politicians, former police officers and ex-prison staff.

The prison aims to rehabilitate prisoners. Inmates are taught industrial cleaning in a specially-kitted out teaching area and in 2024 HMP Dumfries won an award for the quality of their training from the British Institute of Cleaning Science (BICS).

The prison was built in 1883 by Thomas Bernard Collinson and extended with additions in 1988. The old building is a Category B Listed Building. It is one of only three purpose built 19th century prisons still in use, the others being HM Prison Perth and HM Prison Barlinnie.

== Residential units ==
There are five main residential halls A, B, C, D and E and a basement B Zero which includes prisoners on observation/separation.

== Notable prisoners ==
- Kevin Guthrie, actor and convicted sex offender
- Peter Murrell former Scottish National Party chief executive sentenced to five years and three months for embezzlement of SNP funds.
