= Lonnie Latham =

The Reverend Dr. Lonnie Latham (born January 7, 1946) served as the senior pastor of South Tulsa Baptist Church, in Tulsa, Oklahoma, a post he held from 2002 to January 6, 2006, when he resigned from that position as well as from the executive committee of the Southern Baptist Convention (where he served as one of four such members from Oklahoma), and as the recording secretary of the Southern Baptist General Convention of Oklahoma. His resignation came after his arrest for lewdness. He was later acquitted of the lewdness charge on March 7, 2007.

== History in the Tulsa Metro Baptist Association ==
Lonnie Latham was elected director of missions for the Tulsa Metro Baptist Association during their November 13–14, 2000 meeting. The meeting also saw the controversial adoption of the Baptist Faith and Message, a pivotal document in the Southern Baptist Convention's "Conservative Resurgence." According to one report, Latham has spoken out against expansion of tribal gaming in Oklahoma, as well as against homosexuality. In the latter vein, he supported the SBC's adoption of a policy encouraging Baptists to befriend gays and lesbians and to help them "reject their sinful, destructive lifestyle."

The September 16, 2001 edition of Tulsa World describes Latham as executive director of the Tulsa Metro Baptist Association.

== Opposition to gambling ==
On Tuesday, October 26, 2004, one week before the 2004 General Election, Latham addressed the subject of State Question 712, a referendum on the expansion of tribal gaming and installation of gambling machines at three local racetracks. Speaking to attendees of the Tulsa Press Club’s “Two Views” luncheon, Latham said:

"It grieves my heart to think we would do anything to undermine the effectiveness of the average home or the average person in our state...We don’t need gambling to help Oklahoma. What we do need is an empathetic heart toward small business. Through them, we’ll gain a true economic base for our state."

“The petition would be to allow the state’s people to vote on whether or not they want this kind of casino gambling in the state,” he said. “.... We’re hoping that we can gather not only 51,000 names but also many more who will see this as the moral issue that it is.”

Latham also said the social costs of gaming outweigh its benefits, and he opposed efforts to establish a state lottery.

State voters eventually approved both expanded Indian gaming and a lottery.

== 2006 arrest ==
On Tuesday, January 3, 2006, Latham was arrested and booked into the Oklahoma County Jail by members of the Oklahoma County Sheriff's Office. The misdemeanor charge was that of "Offering to Engage In An Act of Lewdness," a charge carrying penalties of up to a year in jail and a US$2,500 fine. Reports sourced to a police department spokesman said that he had propositioned a plainclothes police officer for oral sex in an area of the community which had been the subject of public complaints of cruising related to male prostitution.

Latham was arrested around 9:45 p.m. and his automobile was impounded. The arrest took place in the parking lot of The Habana Inn. Reportedly, Latham followed a plainclothes police officer's car for several blocks, ultimately pulling up beside it. Latham told the officer that he enjoyed "a particular lewd act" and then solicited the police officer to perform the act at a room Latham said he had booked at the nearby Holiday Inn Express. Latham did not offer money in exchange, so he was not charged with soliciting prostitution.

Upon posting bail, Latham contested the charge to local television reporters, saying "I was set up. I was in the area pastoring to police."

"I was involved in a prayer ministry in that area, and I had a dialogue with police," he said, according to the website of the Daily Oklahoman newspaper. "The officer made many suggestions."

According to police officials, Latham made no mention of prayer, told the officer his name was "Luke," and said he was from Dallas and worked frequently in Oklahoma City and Tulsa.

This was not Latham's first visit to the area. Public records show that on December 2, 1998, at about 11:30 p.m., Latham was issued a traffic ticket for "failure to stop for a stop sign" at NW 39th and Frankford. This intersection is only blocks from where Latham was arrested and serves as rear access to the Habanna Inn."

=== Reaction within the Southern Baptist Convention ===
South Tulsa Baptist Church issued the following statement:

"We are deeply grieved to hear the news about our pastor, Lonnie Latham. Our first concerns are with Lonnie, his family, and our church family. We will be focused on doing what we can to minister to everyone in this difficult time. Our church has a great history and a great future of ministry in this community. We would appreciate your prayers."

On January 8, 2006 Rev. Lonnie Latham notified The Baptist General Convention of Oklahoma that he was resigning from the BGCO Board of Directors effective immediately.

“We are deeply saddened by the recent events regarding Lonnie. We continue to be concerned for South Tulsa Baptist Church and the Latham family. We pray Lonnie will find healing and restoration as he seeks help for the issues he faces,” said Heidi B. Wilburn, spokeswoman for the BGCO. "Lonnie’s resignation has been accepted without the BGCO Board of Directors having to take initiative regarding the matter. Lonnie also indicated he has resigned from the Executive Committee of the Southern Baptist Convention."

Anthony Jordan, BGCO executive director-treasurer, spoke with Baptist Press after having talked with Latham.

"We have a dual responsibility," Jordan said.

"From the standpoint of the church and, certainly, as brothers in Christ, we are to hold Lonnie to the biblical standard of morality and to hold him accountable for his actions." He added, "Lonnie has responded to that admonition by resigning from his church, asking their forgiveness and stepping aside to seek healing.

"At the same time, in the midst of failure, the church is to be a place of restoration," he said. "That is the biblical admonition."

On January 9, 2006 a letter from Latham to his congregation was released. Morris Chapman, CEO of the Southern Baptist Convention, says of Latham - "In spite of his denials soon after his arrest, he now acknowledges the incident did happen and that he needs help."

Dr. Charles A. Cruce, Director of Missions for The Tulsa Metro Association of Baptist Churches posted the following message:

"Our association of churches is saddened by the recent news concerning our former Executive Director, Dr. Lonnie Latham, now pastor of our own South Tulsa Baptist Church. We hurt deeply for Lonnie, for his loved ones, and for the wonderful church that he pastors. While we certainly do not condone this type of behavior, it is so important for us to remember that Lonnie is one of our own and our actions toward him as a fellow member of God’s Family should be responses of grace, mercy, and forgiveness. What has happened in this situation only demonstrates that we are all human, that we all make mistakes and that we all fail. That is why we need a Savior who heals, who forgives, and who restores ... that’s why we need Jesus."

=== Reaction from within the GLBT community ===
Jamie McDaniel, a spokesperson for Soulforce who works to change the antigay policies of the SBC, said: "It’s tragic that so many, like Rev. Latham, have never been told the truth that they can live with dignity and express their God-given sexuality in ways that are open, honest, loving and life-affirming. Trapped by Southern Baptist misinformation, many people of faith think their only option is to live a dark and secretive double-life. The SBC needs to be held accountable for causing this kind of needless suffering."

Writes Leslie Robinson of the gay newspaper, The Dallas Voice, "Whew, good thing I’m not required to take such a high-minded approach. I appreciate that Latham has likely been suffering a long time, and that his family is in pain. But the man has been a colonel in the campaign against us, so I prefer to point, yell 'Hypocrite!' and resign myself to the fact that I won’t be on Soulforce’s Christmas-card list."

In a January 6 press release, The National Gay and Lesbian Taskforce commented: "This isn't the first time he's been in the area, having received a traffic violation there a few years back.

"Rev. Latham has been an outspoken opponent of...rights for lesbian, gay, bisexual and transgender people. And, of course, in recent years the Southern Baptist Convention - the nation's largest Protestant denomination - has become increasingly homophobic and aligned itself with the worst elements of the far right in working to stop Marriage Equality for gay people...

"These kinds of situations involving anti-gay political and religious leaders being caught, literally, with their pants down are hardly uncommon. My instinctual reaction has always been one of smug satisfaction - "serves the damn hypocrite right."

"...I only feel sadness for Rev. Latham and his family."

Rev. Dr. Mel White, founder of Soulforce, an organization which works on behalf of lesbian, gay, bisexual, and transgender people to oppose religious and political oppression, commented about Rev. Latham's arrest: "No one should have to come out via an undercover sting operation. That is its own evil. Until the Southern Baptist Convention ends their spiritual violence against gay and lesbian people, tragedies like this will continue."

== Results of criminal trial ==
On February 2, 2006, Latham pleaded not guilty to the lewdness charge. The case was then heard in a non-jury trial.

On March 7, 2007, Latham was found to be not guilty by Special Judge Roma McElwee, who said her ruling was based on the evidence and not on the issue of the constitutionality of the law in question.

Latham's attorney, Mack Martin, has told reporters that what his client did was Constitutionally protected and shouldn't be a crime. “It’s like saying you’re arrested for crossing the street — so what?” Martin said. “This is a major First Amendment issue.”

Mack says he feels the only reason that the court is pursuing charges is because of pressure from the media attention.

But Oklahoma City District Attorney Wes Lane says, “The law in Oklahoma prohibits an individual from soliciting another to engage in what is considered a lewd act regardless of whether money is sought for or exchanged.” The American Civil Liberties Union filed a brief for Latham, stating that the law is unconstitutional because it makes it a crime for an adult to ask another adult to engage in legal conduct.
