= John Latham (ornithologist) =

English physician, naturalist and author (1740–1837)

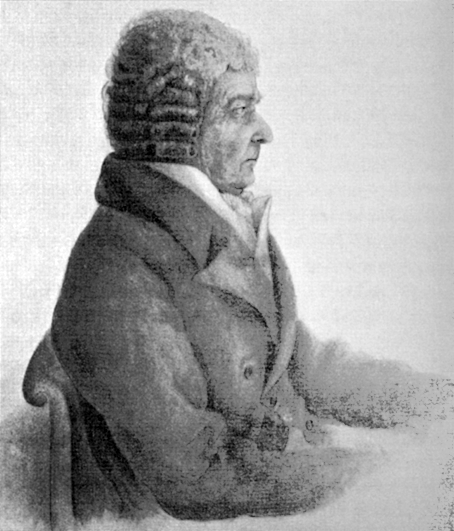
- Born: 27 June 1740; Eltham, Kent, England
- Died: 4 February 1837 (aged 96); Winchester, Hampshire, England
- Known for: A General Synopsis of Birds
- Scientific career
- Fields: Ornithology
- Author abbrev. (zoology): Latham

John Latham FRS (27 June 1740 – 4 February 1837) was an English medical doctor, naturalist and author. His main works were A General Synopsis of Birds (1781–1801) and A General History of Birds (1821–1828). He was able to examine specimens of Australian birds that reached England in the final twenty years of the 18th century, and was responsible for providing English names for many of them. He named some of Australia's most famous birds, including the emu, sulphur-crested cockatoo, wedge-tailed eagle, superb lyrebird, Australian magpie, magpie-lark, white-throated needletail and pheasant coucal. Latham has been called the "grandfather" of Australian ornithology. He was also the first to describe the hyacinth macaw from South America.

== Biography ==
John Latham was born on 27 June 1740 at Eltham in northwest Kent. He was the eldest son of John Latham (died 1788), a surgeon, and his mother, who was a descendant of the Sothebys, in Yorkshire.

He was educated at Merchant Taylors' School and then studied anatomy under William Hunter and completed his medical education in London hospitals. In 1763 at the age of 23, he began working as a physician in the village of Darenth, near Dartford in Kent. In the same year he married Ann Porter. They had four children of whom two survived childhood: a son John (1769–1822) and a daughter Ann Latham (1772–1835), who illustrated many of his birds.

Latham retired from his medical practice aged 56 in 1796 and moved to live near his son at Romsey in Hampshire. His wife died in 1798 and Latham remarried the same year to Ann Delamott. His son who had invested in a series of inns became heavily indebted and was declared bankrupt in 1817. Latham lost much of his wealth in supporting his son. In 1819, Latham sold his house in Romsey and moved with his wife to live with his daughter's family in Winchester. His second wife died in 1821 and in the following year his son died by suicide.

Latham died aged 96 in Winchester on 4 February 1837 and was buried in Romsey Abbey.

== Contribution to ornithology ==
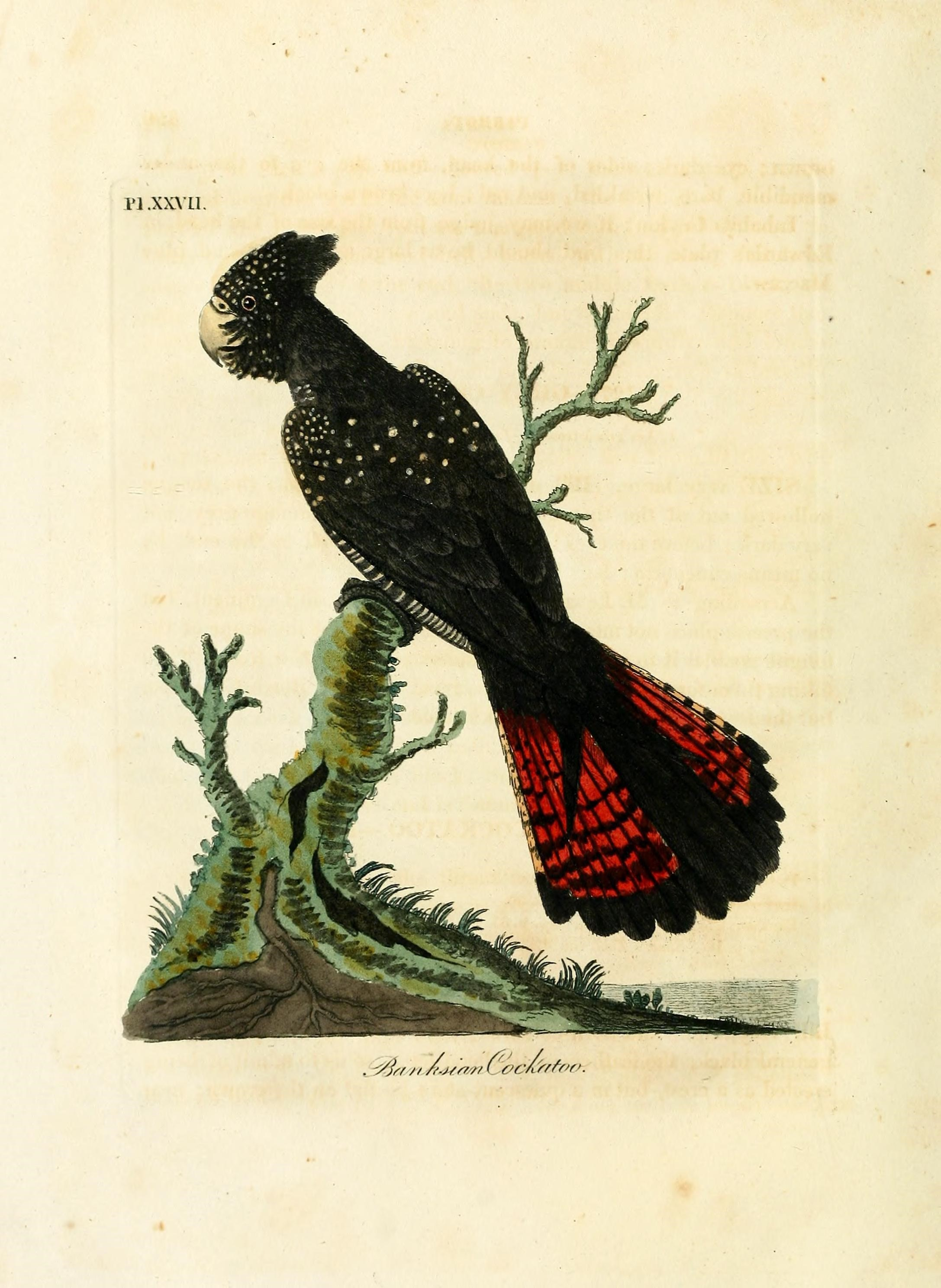
Drawing of the red-tailed black cockatoo based on a drawing by Ann Latham, a colour plate from A General History of Birds (vol. 2, 1822)

A General Synopsis of Birds (1781–1785) was Latham's first ornithological work and contained 106 illustrations provided by the author. It described many new species that Latham had discovered in various museums and collections. In that work, as with Georges-Louis Leclerc, Comte de Buffon, he did not attach importance to the names of the species that he described. Later, Latham realised that only the use of the Linnean binomial system would give him the honour of originating a species' scientific name. Thus he published Index Ornithologicus in 1790, in which he specified a binomial name for all the species he had previously described.

However, it was too late, because Johann Friedrich Gmelin had already published his own version of Linnaeus' Systema Naturæ, in which he had given a scientific name to Latham's species. Taking into account the rules of nomenclature, Gmelin's work has priority. Nevertheless, there are around eighty bird species for which Latham's 1790 publication is cited as the authority. They include the emu, the black swan, the hyacinth macaw, the sulphur-crested cockatoo, and the noisy friarbird.

He had a supplement to Index Ornithologicus, containing additional scientific names, published as Supplementum Indicis Ornithologici in 1801. It is the authority for around seventy species of birds, almost all of which occur only in Australasia. They include the Pacific gull, the barking owl, the noisy miner, the Australian magpie and the magpie-lark. Publication dates are important for establishing priority in naming species, and there was speculation from the 1990s that Supplementum Indicis Ornithologici had not been available until 1802, but further research showed that the 1801 publication date is probably correct, and so it is accepted as such by naming authorities.

Working from drawings, Latham appears to have had difficulty in distinguishing the different species, and he described some more than once under different names. In the case of the Australian noisy miner, he did that four times in Supplementum Indicis Ornithologici: as the chattering bee-eater (Merops garrulus), the black-headed grakle (Gracula melanocephala), the hooded bee-eater (Merops cucullatus), and the white-fronted bee-eater (Merops albifrons). This has caused some confusion in the ornithological literature as to the correct scientific name.

Beginning in 1821, when Latham was in his eighties, he published an expanded version of his earlier work in eleven volumes, with the title A General History of Birds. The ornithologist Alfred Newton later wrote in Encyclopædia Britannica that: "his defects as a compiler, which had been manifest before, rather increased with age, and the consequences were not happy."

Latham maintained a regular correspondence with Thomas Pennant, Joseph Banks, Ashton Lever and others. He was elected to the Royal Society in 1775, and also took part in the creation of the Linnean Society. In 1812, he was elected a foreign member of the Royal Swedish Academy of Sciences.

== Works ==
- Latham, John (1781–1785). A General Synopsis of Birds. London: Printed for Benj. White. 3 volumes
- Latham, John (1787). Supplement to the General Synopsis of Birds. London: Leigh & Sotheby.
- Latham, John (1790). Index Ornithologicus, sive Systema Ornithologiae: Complectens Avium Divisionem in Classes, Ordines, Genera, Species, Ipsarumque Varietates (in Latin). London: Leigh & Sotheby. 2 volumes
- Latham, John (1801). Supplement II to the General Synopsis of Birds. London: Leigh & Sotheby.
- Latham, John (1801). Supplementum Indicis Ornithologici, sive Systematis Ornithologiae (in Latin). London: Leigh & Sotheby.
- Latham, John (1821–1828). A General History of Birds. Winchester, England: Jacob and Johnson. 10 volumes + index
