= John Leatham =

Australian rules footballer

Personal information
- Full name: John Leatham
- Born: 23 August 1946 (age 80)
- Original team: Maffra Rovers
- Height: 183 cm (6 ft 0 in)
- Weight: 76 kg (168 lb)
- Position: Ruckman/Defender

Playing career^{1}
Years	Club	Games (Goals)
1967	Carlton	2 (0)
- ^{1} Playing statistics correct to the end of 1967.

John Leatham (born 23 August 1946) is a former Australian rules footballer who played with Carlton in the Victorian Football League (VFL).
