= Mike Latham =

English cricketer (born 1939)

Personal information
- Full name: Michael Edward Latham
- Born: 14 January 1939 (age 87); Moseley, Birmingham, England
- Batting: Right-handed
- Bowling: Right-arm fast medium
- Role: Bowler
- Relatives: Son, Patrick

Domestic team information
- Years: Team
- 1961–62: Somerset
- 1963–72: Northumberland
- First-class debut: 6 May 1961 Somerset v Hampshire
- Last First-class: 21 August 1962 Somerset v Northamptonshire
- Only List A: 15 May 1971 Northumberland v Lincolnshire

Career statistics
Competition	First-class	List A
Matches	18	1
Runs scored	133	26
Batting average	14.77	–
100s/50s	–/–	–/–
Top score	21*	26*
Balls bowled	2040	36
Wickets	29	–
Bowling average	30.62	–
5 wickets in innings	2	–
10 wickets in match	–	–
Best bowling	5/20	0/32
Catches/stumpings	10/–	–/–
- Source: CricketArchive, 12 November 2010

Michael Edward Latham (born 14 January 1939) played first-class cricket for Somerset in 1961 and 1962. He also played for Northumberland for many years in the Minor Counties and appeared for them in one List A match in 1971. He was born in Birmingham.

A right-handed lower-order batsman and right-arm fast-medium bowler, Latham played for Gloucestershire's second eleven in 1959 and 1960 before switching to Somerset for the 1961 season. He made his first-class debut in the first home match of the season, taking three wickets in the Hampshire first innings (and one in the second) before arriving in the Somerset second innings, as No 11 batsman, with his side still 59 runs short of a target of 172 in a low-scoring match; with Brian Langford he put on 40 before Langford was bowled. Latham's unbeaten 21 proved to be the highest score of his first-class career. He played in only two other first-class matches in the 1961 season.

In the 1962 season, Latham played in almost half of Somerset's matches, though with a side full of fast-medium and medium-pace bowlers, he was bowled sparingly. He was the sixth bowler used when he played against Nottinghamshire at Bath and won the match by taking five for 20 in less than 10 overs, bowling off-cutters. But in the second match of the three-match Bath festival of cricket he was still the sixth bowler used in each innings, bowling only six overs in the game, and he was dropped for the third match. Selected again a couple of weeks later, he took five for 61 in Yorkshire's first innings in the game at Taunton on a batsman's pitch. And in his final match of the season, an innings victory over Northamptonshire at Weston-super-Mare his four for 54 in the Northants first innings was the best of the Somerset bowlers. That, however, proved to be the last first-class match of Latham's career as he left the Somerset staff at the end of the season "to take up employment in engineering", and though he was expected to be "available for some matches", that did not happen.

Instead, Latham moved to North-East England and began playing Minor Counties cricket for Northumberland, appearing for them for 10 seasons through to 1972. In 1971, he made his only List A appearance, an all-Minor County Gillette Cup match against Lincolnshire in which he made an unbeaten 26 with the bat but failed to take a wicket.

Latham's son Patrick Latham has played List A and Minor Counties cricket for Cambridgeshire and had second eleven matches in 1998 for both Durham and Somerset.
