= Gerald Leatham =

English cricketer

Gerald Arthur Buxton Leatham (30 April 1851 – 19 June 1932) was an English amateur first-class cricketer, who played twelve matches for Yorkshire County Cricket Club between 1874 and 1886. He played thirty two matches in all, including games for the Marylebone Cricket Club (MCC) from 1876 to 1882 and for Gentlemen of England (1874–1886), Gentlemen of the North (1879–1880), The Gentlemen (1882), an England Eleven (1881–1882), C. I. Thornton's XI (1883 and 1884), Rest of England (1883), and A. J. Webbe's XI (1887).

The son of W.H. Leatham, he was born at Hemsworth Hall, Pontefract, Yorkshire, England, and educated at Uppingham School. A specialist wicket-keeper, he took 47 catches and completed 20 stumpings in all. A right-handed tail-order batsman, he scored 172 runs at 5.21 with a top score of 20. He bowled one over, a maiden, without success. His cousin, Albert Leatham, played fifty-three matches for Gloucestershire, the MCC and others whilst his nephew, Hugh Leatham, one match for an invitation XI in 1914.

Leatham worked in a family banking business, which was later absorbed by Barclays. He was also a good golfer and involved in the Bramham Moor Hunt.

He died in June 1932 in Dinas, Padstow, Cornwall.
