= Ann Latham =

British entomologist, scientific illustrator and colourist (1772–1835)

- Born: 1772; Darenth, Kent, England
- Died: 21 January 1835 (aged 62–63); Winchester, Hampshire, England
- Occupations: Entomologist, scientific illustrator and watercolourist
- Known for: Ornithology illustrator
- Spouse: William Nicholas Wickham
- Father: John Latham

Ann Latham (1772–1835) was a British entomologist, scientific illustrator and watercolourist who made "significant contributions to both ornithology and entomology" when she collaborated with her ornithologist father who documented many new bird species from the British colonies between 1780 and 1828. Some of her work is conserved in the Natural History Museum, London.

== Biography ==
Latham was born in 1772 in Darenth, Kent, England, to the ornithologist John Latham (1740–1837) and Ann Porter of Bexley, who married on 12 September 1763.

=== Career ===
Latham became a skilled artist during her teenage years and early twenties when she assisted her "highly regarded father" by drawing and painting birds and butterflies based on drawings and specimens that he and other naturalists collected, including new bird species collected in Australia. Some of her watercolours, along with plates that were etched based on those drawings, are conserved in the Natural History Museum, London in the John Latham Collection (888 watercolours in 6 volumes with 1030 sheets, including some prints).

All of the drawings of birds and butterflies attributed to her were created before her marriage in 1795 because, "as was the custom at the end of the 18th century, when a woman married she frequently ceased to paint and draw, and Ann appears to have followed this practice."

Latham's bird drawings date from the late 1780s. According to Jackson, "It is greatly to be regretted that Ann found it necessary to cease recording the exciting new species that were flooding into Britain, many passing through her father’s hands for 30 years after she married, during which time there is no indication that she assisted him."

One of her drawings about a "Bankian Cockatoo" (now known as a Red-tailed black cockatoo) from Australia was published in “Voyage of Governor Phillip to Botany Bay; with an Account of the Establishment of the Colonies of Port Jackson & Norfolk Island” printed in London c1789 by John Stockdale.

She painted other conserved illustrations of exotic Lepidoptera, mostly butterflies, before 1793. Many are held in the Warden and Fellows’ Library, Winchester College, Winchester. Her butterfly paintings are bound in two volumes dated 1793: Volume one has 144 figures and Volume two has 276 figures.

=== Marriage ===
In 1795, Latham married the surgeon, William Nicholas Wickham, in Winchester, Hampshire. They had seven children, resulting in "a remarkable dynasty of physicians and surgeons, clergymen, lawyers, and headmasters of public schools".

=== Last years ===
Latham's life after 1795 is not well documented. She died in the parish of St Thomas, Winchester, on 21 January 1835.
