= Latham, Ohio =

Unincorporated community in Ohio, U.S.

Coordinates: 39°05′56″N 83°14′48″W

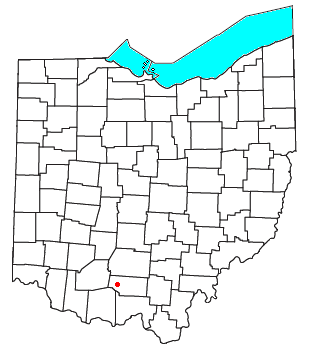
Location of Latham, Ohio

Latham is an unincorporated community in eastern Mifflin Township, Pike County, Ohio, United States. It has a post office with the ZIP code 45646. It lies along State Route 124.

== Gallery ==
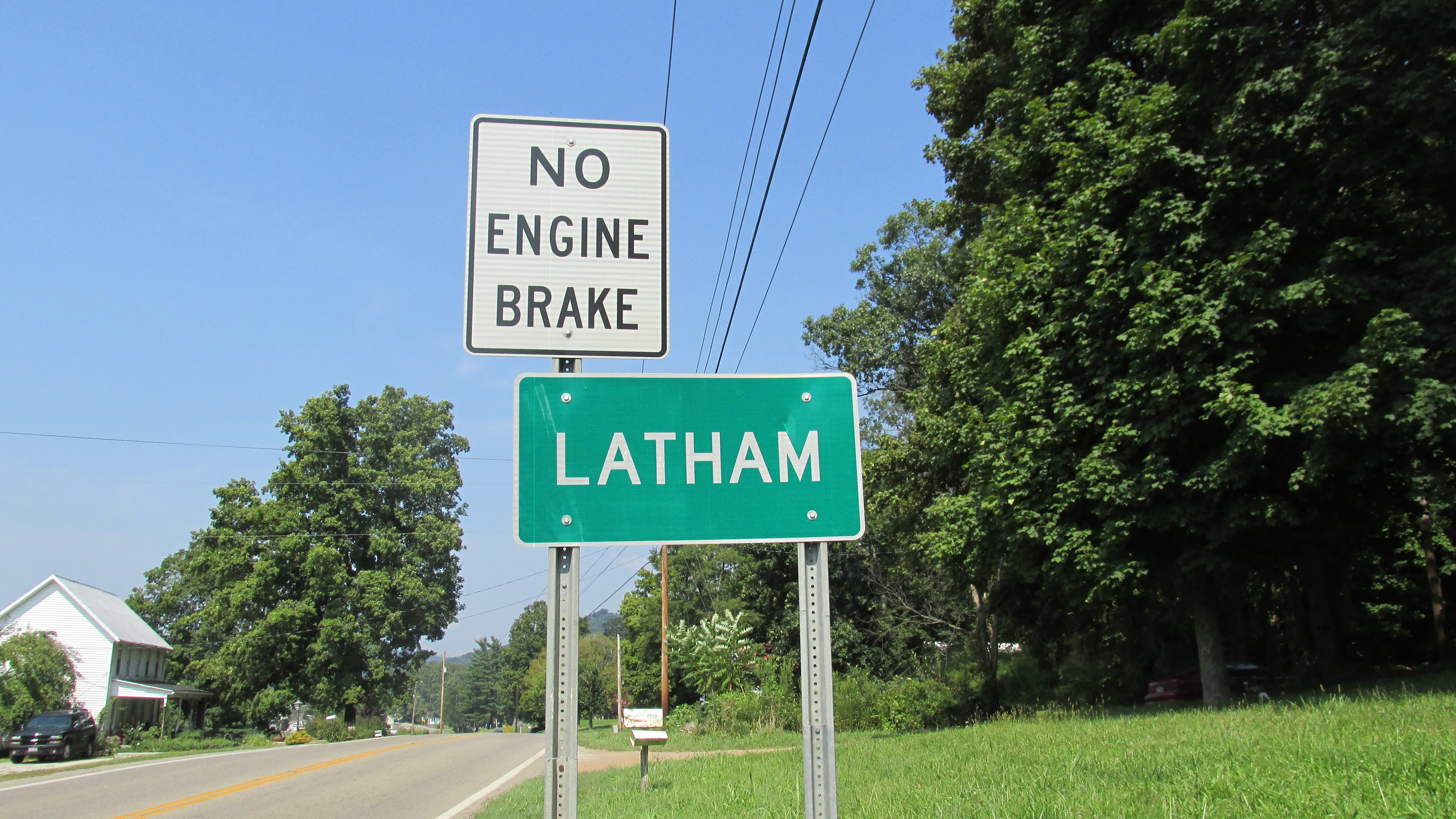
Latham boundary sign

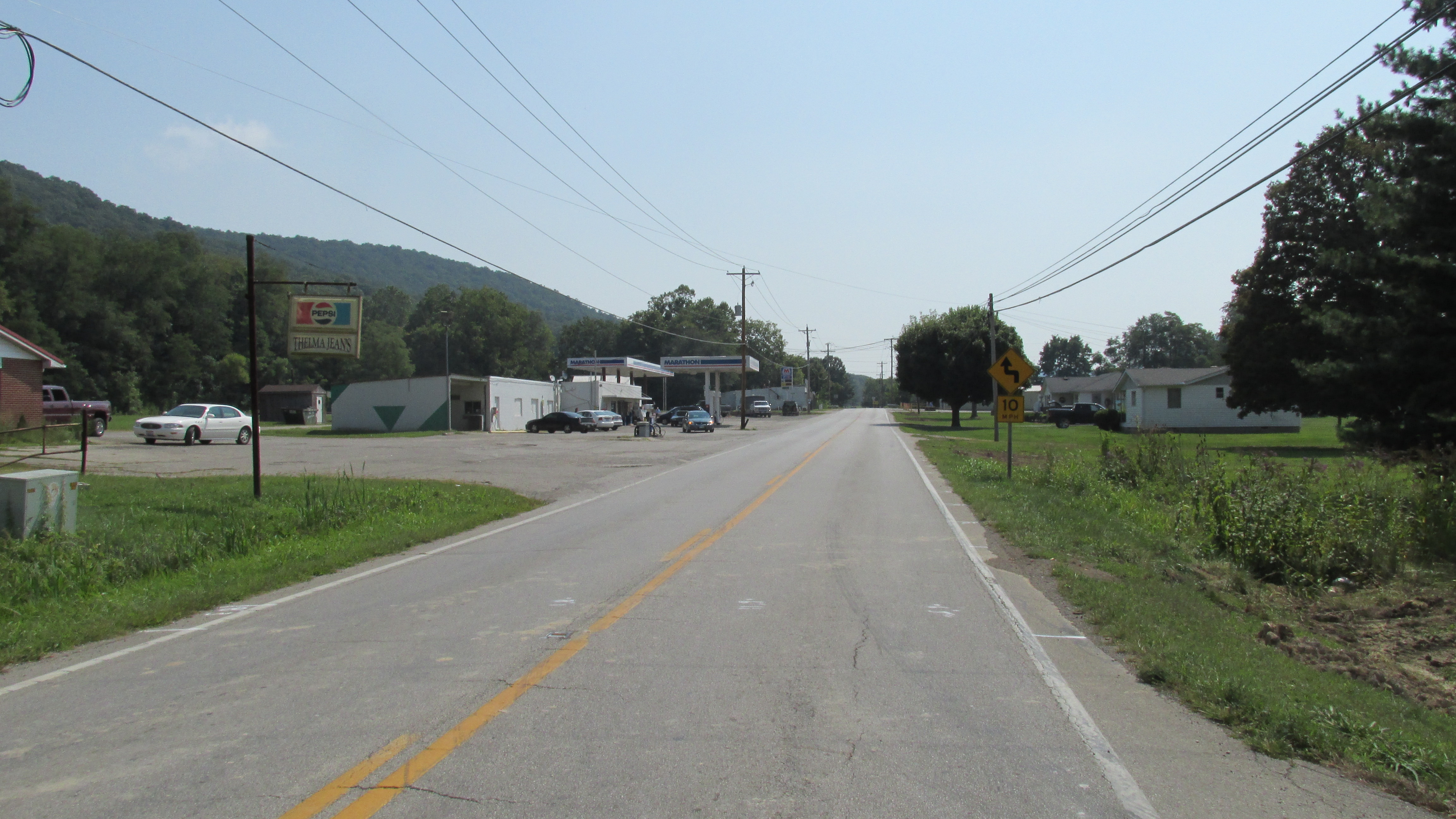
Looking east on Ohio Highway 124 in Latham

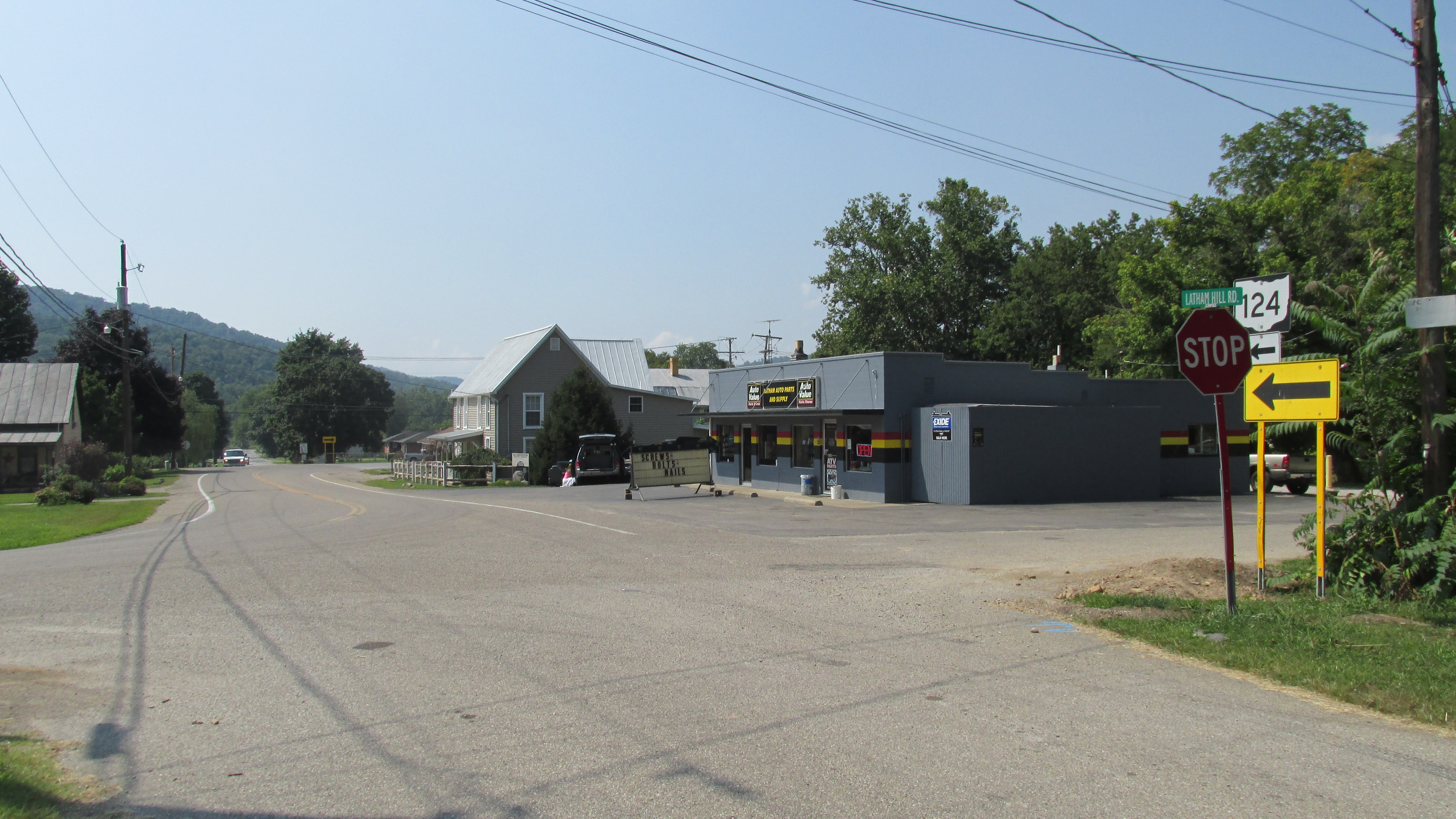
Looking south on Ohio Highway 124 in Latham
