= Patrick Latham =

English cricketer (born 1975)

Personal information
- Full name: James Patrick Thomas Latham
- Born: 8 October 1975 (age 51); Hexham, Northumberland, England
- Batting: Right-handed
- Bowling: Right-arm medium
- Relatives: Mike Latham (father)

Domestic team information
- Years: Team
- 1997–2002: Cambridgeshire

Career statistics
Competition	List A
Matches	1
Runs scored	12
Batting average	12.00
100s/50s	–/–
Top score	12
Balls bowled	24
Wickets	–
Bowling average	–
5 wickets in innings	–
10 wickets in match	–
Best bowling	–
Catches/stumpings	–/–
- Source: Cricinfo, 17 May 2011

James Patrick Thomas Latham (born 8 October 1975) is an English cricketer. Latham is a right-handed batsman who bowls right-arm medium pace. He was born in Hexham, Northumberland.

Latham made his debut for Cambridgeshire in the 1997 Minor Counties Championship against Bedfordshire. Latham played Minor counties cricket for Cambridgeshire from 1997 to 2002, which included 23 Minor Counties Championship matches and 4 MCCA Knockout Trophy matches. In 1999, he made his only List A appearance against Kent in the NatWest Trophy. In this match he scored 12 runs before being dismissed by Dean Headley. With the ball he bowled 4 wicket-less overs.

Latham has previously represented the Durham Second XI and the Somerset Second XI in Second XI cricket. His father, Mike Latham, played first-class cricket for Somerset and List A cricket for Northumberland.
