= Hubert Latham (cricketer) =

English cricketer (1932–2017)

Hubert Joseph Latham (13 September 1932 – 22 May 2017) was an English cricketer who played first-class cricket in 10 matches for Warwickshire between 1955 and 1959. He was born in Winson Green, Birmingham.

Latham was a right-handed lower-order batsman and a right-arm fast bowler who played in first-class cricket as an amateur. He appeared in a couple of Warwickshire's less important first-class fixtures in 1955 and 1956, and was picked for another one of these non-County Championship games, against the Combined Services cricket team, early in the 1958 season: he took six second-innings wickets against what was a county-standard services team. He remained in the Warwickshire side for the six County Championship matches across May 1958 and took a few wickets in all of them, but then left the team and did not reappear, except in a single non-Championship game 14 months later in July 1959. He also appeared in occasional second eleven matches through to 1964.
