= Simon Latham =

English writer on falconry

Simon Latham (fl. 1618) was an English writer on falconry.

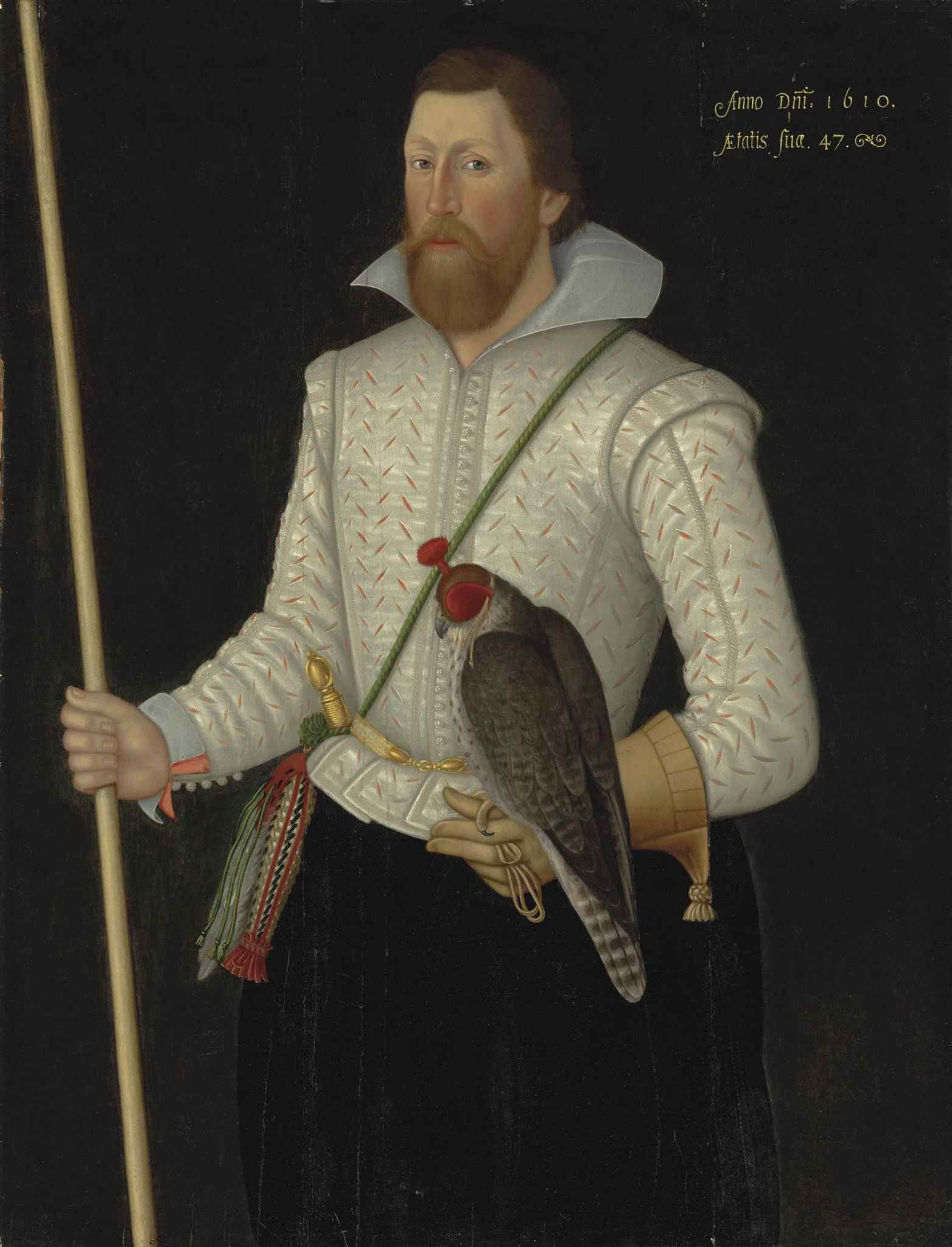
Sir Thomas Monson

== Publications and background ==
Little is known of his life. At the request of his friends he embodied his experiences in a treatise: Lathams Falconry or the Faulcons Lure and Cure; in two Bookes. "The first, concerning the ordering … of all Hawkes in generall, especially the Haggard Favlcon Gentle. The second, teaching approved medicines for the cure of all Diseases in them....". The two volumes appeared in 1614 and 1618, and were reissued in 1633, 1658 and 1665. The treatise was dedicated to Sir Thomas Monson, 1st Baronet, master of the King's hawks. Latham acknowledged that he derived his "art and understanding" from Henry Sadler of Everley, Wiltshire, third son of Sir Ralph Sadleir, grand falconer to Queen Elizabeth.

There was also published in 1662 under his name The Gentleman's Exercise, or Supplement to the Bookes of Faulconry.

Latham is thought to have been the nephew of Lewis Latham of Elstow, Bedfordshire, under falconer (1625) but afterwards (1627) serjeant falconer to the King, who died a reputed centenarian in May 1655.
