= William H. Latham (icebreaker) =

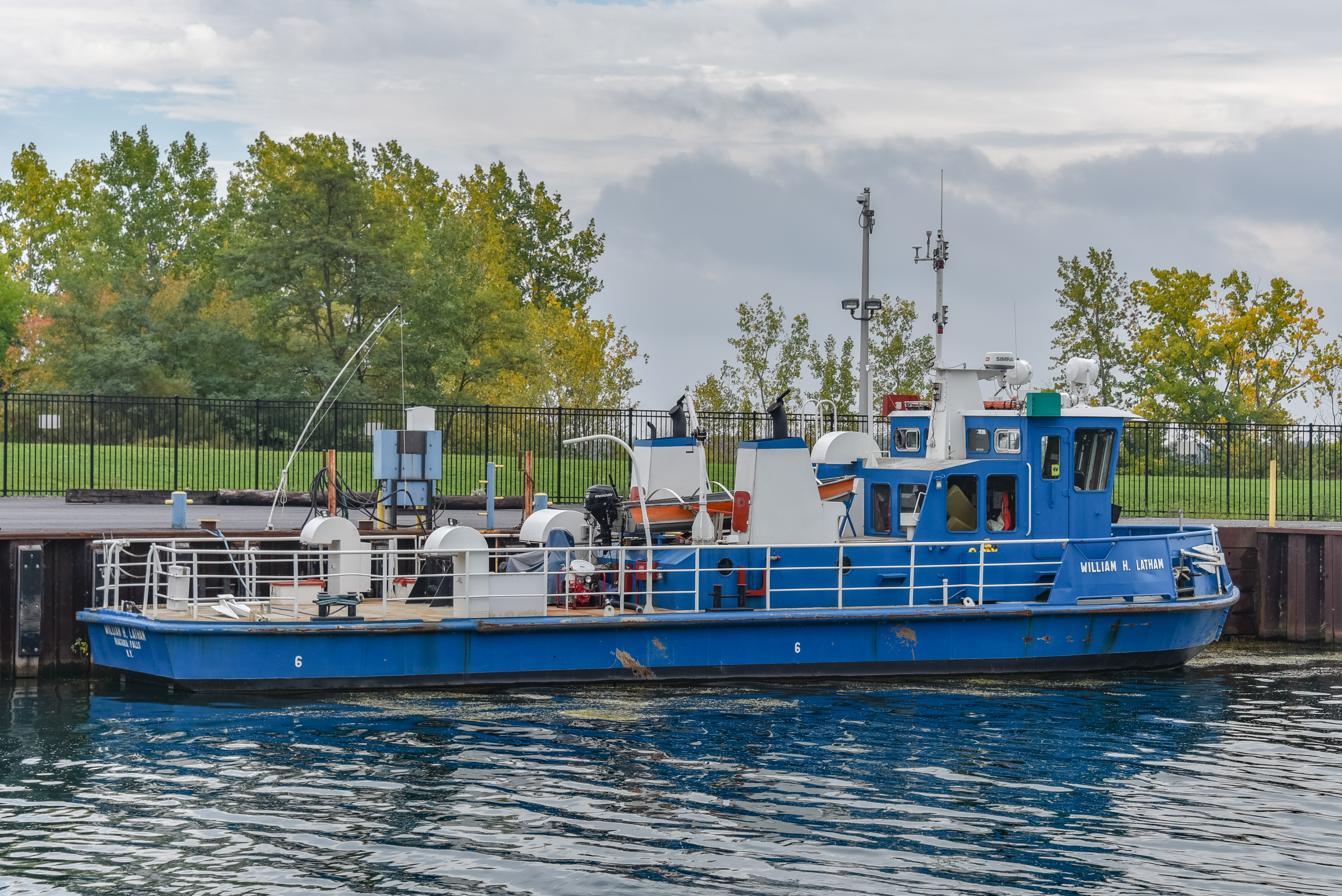
- Icebreaker William H. Latham at Niagara Falls, NY

History
- Namesake: William H. Latham
- Owner: New York Power Authority
- Launched: 1987
- Identification: MMSI number: 366844950; Callsign: WXL8094

General characteristics
- Tonnage: 77 tons
- Installed power: 2 × Caterpillar 3412, 625 hp (466 kW)
- Crew: 3

William H. Latham is a 77-ton icebreaker owned and operated by the New York Power Authority on the Niagara River. It was named after William H. Latham, a senior engineer with the Power Authority who died in 1987. The ship's mission is to keep the Power Authority's inlet ports clear of ice. Occasionally, she is used to break open the Buffalo river or the Lake Erie ice boom for emergency repairs. William H. Latham has been used for DEC fish stocking out of the Dunkirk Harbor, search and rescue for downed aircraft, and search duties for missing hikers on frozen Lake Erie.

During emergencies two crews work alternating twelve-hour shifts to keep the vessel functioning twenty-four hours a day.

The vessel's design and construction was overseen by Randy D. Crissman.

William H. Latham is assisted by a second vessel, a modified tugboat, known only as Breaker.

Ontario Hydro operates a similar vessel, Niagara Queen, to clear the inlet ports for hydroelectric power generators on the Canadian side.
