= William H. Latham =

William H. Latham (November 9, 1903 – January 15, 1987) was a senior engineer with the New York Power Authority.

After growing up in Norwich, Connecticut, he graduated from MIT with a degree in civil engineering in 1926.

Beginning in 1927, he was professionally associated with Robert Moses, the "master builder" of New York City and Long Island.

Prior to being responsible for the Niagara Project Latham had been in charge of the Power Authorities first hydroelectric project on the St Lawrence River. In 1956, when he was appointed to direct the construction of the Power Authority's Niagara Project, it was the largest project of its kind in the world.

New York Power Authority's primary icebreaker, the William H. Latham, is named after him.

He was described as "an athlete and outdoorsman ... a tall, rangy man with huge shoulders and an easy, friendly grin."
