= Bob Leathem =

Canadian football player

Profile
- Position: End

Personal information
- Born: c. 1925
- Died: July 7, 1996 (aged 71); Calgary, Alberta, Canada

Career history
- 1946–1948: Calgary Stampeders

Awards and highlights
- Grey Cup champion (1948)

Robert Hugh Leathem (c. 1925 – July 7, 1996) was a Canadian football player who played for the Calgary Stampeders. He won the Grey Cup with the Stampeders in 1948.
