= List of fellows of the Royal Society elected in 1663 =

This is a complete list of fellows of the Royal Society elected in its fourth year, 1663.

== Founder fellows ==
- Robert Boyle (1627–1691)
- Alexander Bruce, 2nd Earl of Kincardine (1629–1681)
- John Wilkins (1614–1672)
- Sir Christopher Wren (1632–1723)

== Fellows ==
- John Alleyn (1621–1663)
- James Annesley (1645–1690)
- John Aubrey (1626–1697)
- Sir Thomas Baines (1622–1680)
- Peter Ball (1638–1675)
- Ralph Bathurst (1620–1704)
- John Beale (1613–1683)
- George Berkeley (1628–1698)
- Sir John Birkenhead (1616–1679)
- Richard Boyle (d. 1665)
- William Brereton (1632–1680)
- Robert Bruce (1626–1685)
- David Bruce (1657–1690)
- Sir Edward Bysshe (1615–1679)
- Archibald Campbell (1629–1685)
- William Cavendish (1617–1684)
- William Cavendish (1641–1707)
- Walter Charlton (1620–1707)
- Timothy Clarke (d. 1672)
- Sir John Clayton (d. 1710)
- John Clotworthy (d. 1665)
- Daniel Colwall (d. 1690)
- James Compton (1622–1681)
- Anthony Ashley Cooper (1621–1683)
- Edward Cotton (1616–1675)
- Thomas Coxe (1615–1685)
- Thomas Coxe (b. 1640)
- John Crawford-Lindsay (1596–1678)
- John Creed (d. 1701)
- William Croone (1633–1684)
- Sir John Denham (1615–1669)
- Sir Kenelm Digby (1603–1665)
- John Dryden (1631–1700)
- Andrew Ellis (d. 1673)
- Sir George Ent (1604–1689)
- William Erskine (d. 1685)
- John Evelyn (1620–1706)
- Sir Francis Fane (1612–1681)
- Nicasius le Febure (1610–1669)
- Sir John Finch (1626–1682)
- Sir Henry Ford (1617–1684)
- Sir Alexander Fraizer (1610–1681)
- William Gomildon (d. 1691)
- Theodore Haak (1605–1690)
- William Hammond (c. 1635 – c.1685)
- Sir Edward Harley (1624–1700)
- Christopher Hatton (1605–1670)
- Sir James Hayes (d. 1693)
- Thomas Henshaw (1618–1700)
- Nathaniel Henshaw (1628–1673)
- William Hoare (d. 1666)
- William Holder (1616–1698)
- Robert Hooke (1635–1703)
- Sir John Hoskins (1634–1705)
- Charles Howard (1630–1713)
- Christian Huyghens (1629–1695)
- Sir Justinian Isham (1611–1675)
- Richard Jones (1641–1712)
- Sir Andrew King (d. 1678)
- Sir Ellis Leighton (d. 1685)
- Sir James Long (1617–1692)
- Anthony Lowther (1641–1693)
- John Lucas (1606–1671)
- Christopher Merrett (1614–1695)
- Edward Montagu (1625–1672)
- Henry Mordaunt (1624–1697)
- Sir Anthony Morgan (1621–1668)
- Caspar Needham (1622–1679)
- William Neile (1637–1670)
- Sir Thomas Nott (1606–1681)
- Henry Oldenburg (1617–1677)
- Philip Packer (1618–1686)
- Dudley Palmer (1617–1666)
- Robert Paston (1631–1683)
- John Pell (1611–1685)
- Sir William Persall (b. 1601)
- Peter Pett (1610–1672)
- Sir Peter Pett (1630–1699)
- Sir John Pettus (1613–1685)
- Henry Pierrepont (1607–1680)
- Walter Pope (1627–1714)
- Francis Potter (1594–1678)
- Thomas Povey (1615–1702)
- Henry Power (1623–1668)
- Sir Richard Powle (1628–1678)
- Henry Powle (1630–1692)
- Henry Proby (1646–1664)
- William Quatremain (1618–1667)
- Sir Charles Scarburgh (1615–1694)
- Sir James Shaen (d. 1695)
- Henry Slingsby (1621–1688)
- George Smyth (1629–1702)
- Samuel Sorbiere (1615–1670)
- Sir Robert Southwell (1635–1702)
- Thomas Sprat (1635–1713)
- Alexander Stanhope (1638–1707)
- Thomas Stanley (1625–1678)
- Sir John Talbot (1630–1714)
- Sir Gilbert Talbot (1607–1695)
- Christopher Terne (1620–1673)
- Sir Samuel Tuke (d. 1674)
- Victor Beaufort Vabres de Fresars (1663–1674)
- Cornelius Vermuyden (1627–1693)
- Edmund Waller (1606–1687)
- John Wallis (1616–1703)
- Seth Ward (1617–1689)
- Edward Waterhouse (1619–1670)
- Daniel Whistler (1619–1684)
- Sir Joseph Williamson (1633–1701)
- Thomas Willis (1621–1675)
- Francis Willughby (1635–1672)
- John Winthrop (1606–1676)
- Thomas Wren (1633–1679)
- Matthew Wren (1629–1672)
- Sir Peter Wyche (1628–1699)
- Sir Cyril Wyche (1632–1707)
- Edmund Wylde (1618–1695)
- William Wynde (1647–1722)
