= List of original fellows of the Royal Society =

This is a list of the original fellows of the Royal Society, defined as those fellows, excepting the founder fellows, who were elected prior to July 1663. Most were appointed on 20 May or 22 June 1663.

== Fellows ==
- John Alleyn
- James Annesley, 2nd Earl of Anglesey
- Elias Ashmole
- John Aubrey
- John Austen
- Sir Thomas Baines
- Peter Ball
- Isaac Barrow
- George Bate
- George Berkeley, 1st Earl of Berkeley and Viscount Dursley
- Sir John Birkenhead
- Richard Boyle
- William Brereton, 3rd Baron Brereton
- Sir John Brooke
- David Bruce
- Sir Edward Bysshe
- William Cavendish, 1st Duke of Devonshire
- Walter Charlton
- Timothy Clarke
- Sir John Clayton
- Daniel Colwall
- James Compton, 3rd Earl of Northampton
- Edward Cotton
- Thomas Coxe
- John Crawford-Lindsay, 17th Earl of Crawford
- William Croone
- Sir John Denham
- Sir Kenelm Digby
- John Dryden
- Andrew Ellis
- Sir George Ent
- William Erskine
- John Evelyn
- Sir Francis Fane
- Nicasius le Febure
- Sir John Finch
- John Gauden
- Francis Glisson
- Theodore Haak
- William Hammond
- Sir Robert Harley
- Christopher Hatton, 1st Baron Hatton
- Sir James Hayes
- Nathaniel Henshaw
- Thomas Henshaw
- William Hoare
- William Holder
- Robert Hooke
- Sir John Hoskins
- Charles Howard
- Christian Huyghens
- Richard Jones, 1st Earl of Ranelagh
- Sir Andrew King
- Sir James Long
- Anthony Lowther
- John Lucas, 1st Baron Lucas of Shenfield
- Christopher Merrett
- Edward Montagu, 1st Earl of Sandwich and Viscount Hinchinbroke
- Sir Anthony Morgan
- Caspar Needham
- William Neile
- Sir Thomas Nott
- Henry Oldenburg
- Philip Packer
- Dudley Palmer
- Robert Paston, 1st Earl of Yarmouth
- John Pell
- Sir William Persall
- Peter Pett
- Sir Peter Pett
- Henry Pierrepont, 1st Marquess of Dorchester
- Thomas Pockley
- Walter Pope
- Thomas Povey
- Henry Powle
- Sir Richard Powle
- Henry Proby
- William Quatremain
- Giles Rawlins
- Sir Charles Scarburgh
- William Schroter
- Sir James Shaen
- Henry Slingsby
- George Smyth
- Sir Robert Southwell
- Thomas Sprat
- Alexander Stanhope
- Thomas Stanley
- Sir Gilbert Talbot
- Christopher Terne
- Sir Samuel Tuke
- Cornelius Vermuyden
- George Villiers, 2nd Duke of Buckingham
- Edmund Waller
- John Wallis
- Seth Ward
- Daniel Whistler
- Sir Joseph Williamson
- Francis Willughby
- John Winthrop
- Matthew Wren
- Thomas Wren
- Sir Cyril Wyche
- Sir Peter Wyche
- Edmund Wylde
- William Wynde
