= Henshaw (surname) =

Henshaw is a surname. Notable people with the surname include:

- Alex Henshaw (1912–2007), British air racer and test pilot
- David Henshaw (disambiguation), multiple people
- Ernest Henshaw (1870–1950), Australian politician
- George Holt Henshaw (1831–1891), Canadian engineer and draftsman
- Henry Wetherbee Henshaw (1850–1930), American ornithologist
- Jim Henshaw (born 1949), Canadian actor
- John Henshaw (born 1951), British actor
- John Prentiss Kewly Henshaw (1792–1852), Episcopal Church Bishop of Rhode Island
- Joseph Henshaw (1608–1679), Bishop of Peterborough, England
- Julia Wilmotte Henshaw (1869–1937), Canadian botanist, writer, and ambulance driver in the First World War
- Nathaniel Henshaw (1628–c. 1673) Original Fellow of the Royal Society
- Robbie Henshaw (born 1993), Irish Rugby Union player
- Ross Henshaw (born 1952), former Australian rules footballer
- Roy Henshaw (1911–1993), Major League Baseball pitcher
- Simon Henshaw, American diplomat
- Thomas Henshaw (alchemist) (1618–1700) Original Fellow of the Royal Society with Robert Paston, 1st Earl of Yarmouth
- Thomas Henshaw (benefactor) (1731–1810)
- Thomas Henshaw (bishop) (1873–1938), fifth Bishop of Salford, England

Fictional characters:

- Hank Henshaw, DC Comics' Cyborg Superman
- Elizabeth Henshaw, a character from the 2003 film The Haunted Mansion
