= Peter Pett =

Peter Pett may refer to:

- Peter Pett (shipwright, died 1672) (1610–1672), English master-shipwright at Chatham Dockyard
- Peter Pett (shipwright, died 1589) (?–1589), English master-shipwright at Deptford Dockyard
- Sir Peter Pett (lawyer) (1630–1699), English lawyer and author

== See also ==
- Pett dynasty
