= Henshaw =

Henshaw may refer to:

- Henshaw (surname)
- USS Henshaw (DD-278), a destroyer in the United States Navy

== Places ==
- Henshaw, Northumberland, a village in England
- Henshaw, Kentucky, a hamlet in Kentucky
- Lake Henshaw, a lake in California
- Henshaw Cave, part of Cumberland Caverns in Tennessee
