= Villa Angela-St. Joseph High School =

Private coeducational school in Cleveland, Ohio, United States

Villa Angela-St.Joseph High School

Location
- 18491 Lake Shore Boulevard; Cleveland, Ohio 44119; United States
- Coordinates: 41°35′42″N 81°33′03″W

Information
- Type: Private, Coeducational
- Motto: Faith. Family. Future.
- Religious affiliation: Roman Catholic
- Patron saints: Saint Angela Merici and Saint Joseph
- Established: 1990 (VASJ)
- Founder: Society of Mary (Marianists)/Ursuline Sisters
- President: Thomas M. Carone
- Principal: Gregory K. Sedmak
- Grades: 9–12
- Student to teacher ratio: 12:1
- Hours in school day: 8:00 am – 3:00 pm
- Campus type: Urban/Suburban
- Colors: Columbia Blue and Scarlet Red
- Slogan: Faith. Family. Future.
- Fight song: When the Saints Go Marching In
- Athletics: 17 Varsity sports (8 boys, 7 girls, 2 co-ed)
- Athletics conference: Independent
- Mascot: The Viking
- Nickname: VASJ
- Team name: Vikings
- Rival: Euclid High School, Cleveland Central Catholic High School
- Accreditation: North Central Association of Colleges and Schools
- Yearbook: The Viking
- Tuition: Base tuition - $10,200
- Website: vasj.com

Villa Angela-St. Joseph High School is a private Roman Catholic college-preparatory high school located in Cleveland, Ohio, United States. The school's name is commonly abbreviated VASJ. It was formed by the 1990 merger of Villa Angela Academy (all girls) and St. Joseph High School (all boys). It is owned by the Catholic Diocese of Cleveland. The school's core values are grounded in those of the religious orders which had administered the two predecessor schools: the Society of Mary (Marianists) (Saint Joseph High School) and the Ursulines (Villa Angela Academy).

== History ==
=== Villa Angela Academy ===
Villa Angela Academy was founded in the mid-1870s, as a boarding school and academy for girls, by the Ursuline Sisters of Cleveland on property they had purchased on the southern shore of Lake Erie at the mouth of Euclid Creek. The school moved into a new building in 1972. Their athletic teams were nicknamed the Skylarks (Larks) Villa Angela Academy had over 6,000 graduates.

=== St. Joseph High School ===
St. Joseph High School was opened in 1950 on the site of Boulevard Hospital, a general hospital which closed in 1937 (originally, the Cunningham Sanitarium - a facility designed to use pressurized atmosphere as an aid in the treatment of disease). Bishop Edward Francis Hoban had asked the Society of Mary (Marianists) from Dayton, Ohio to administer the school. The school's mascot was the Viking due to the school's proximity to Lake Erie. St. Joseph has over 10,000 graduates.

=== Villa Angela - St. Joseph High School ===
In 1988, the Diocese announced plans to merge these two schools into a new co-educational school that would serve the needs of the east side of Cleveland. The new school would keep both schools' names and traditions. It would be named "Villa Angela - St. Joseph High School" and be located at the St. Joseph building.

The mascot would remain the Viking.

== Academics ==
VASJ has several academic programs including:

- College Preparatory Program
- Honors/Advanced Placement Program
- General Skills Program
- Learning disability Program

== Athletics ==
VASJ competes in Ohio High School Athletic Association (OHSAA).

VASJ competes independent of an athletic conference. VASJ was previously a member of the original Crown Conference from 1967-1980 (as St. Joseph), the North Coast League from 2004-2020, and the second iteration of the Crown Conference from 2021-2022.

=== State championships ===
- Boys basketball - 1991, 1992, 1994, 1995, 2013, 2015, 2017
- Girls basketball - 1999
- Boys cross country – 1965^, 1966^, 1968^, 1969^
- Football – 1989^
- Softball - 1995, 1996, 1997
- Girls volleyball - 2001, 2005
- Wrestling – 1990^

^ Championship won by St. Joseph High School before merging with Villa Angela Academy.

=== Sports offered ===
- Baseball (boys)
- Basketball (boys & girls)
- Bowling (co-ed)
- Cheerleading (co-ed)
- Cross country (boys & girls)
- Dance (co-ed)
- Football (boys)
- Golf (co-ed)
- Soccer (boys & girls)
- Softball (girls)
- Swimming (boys & girls)
- Track (boys & girls)
- Volleyball (boys & girls)
- Wrestling (boys)
- Flag Football (girls)

== Notable alumni ==
Notable alumni from before the 1990 merger are identified with "SJHS" for St. Joseph High School and "VAA" for Villa Angela Academy.

Football

- Abyss - 1988 - SJHS
- Andy Cannavino - 1977 - SJHS
- London Fletcher - 1993
- Bob Golic - 1975 - SJHS
- Mike Golic - 1981 - SJHS
- Elvis Grbac - 1988 - SJHS
- Desmond Howard - 1988 - SJHS
- Lamar Jackson - 2025
- Rich Moore - 1965 - SJHS
- Tom Schoen - 1964 - SJHS
- Greg Urbas - SJHS

Basketball

- Carlton Bragg Jr. - 2015
- Jerrod Calhoun - 2001
- Kevin Edwards - 1983 - SJHS
- Clark Kellogg - 1979 - SJHS
- Stan Kimbrough - 1984 - SJHS
- David Lighty - 2006
- Tony Miller - 1991
- Dererk Pardon - 2015
- Eric Riley - 1988 - SJHS

Politics

- Mary Jo Kilroy - 1967 - VAA
- Dennis E. Eckart - 1968 - SJHS

News/Media

- Kelly O'Donnell - 1983 - VAA

Law

- Tim Misny - 1973 - SJHS
