= Hyperbaric medicine =

Medical treatment at raised ambient pressure

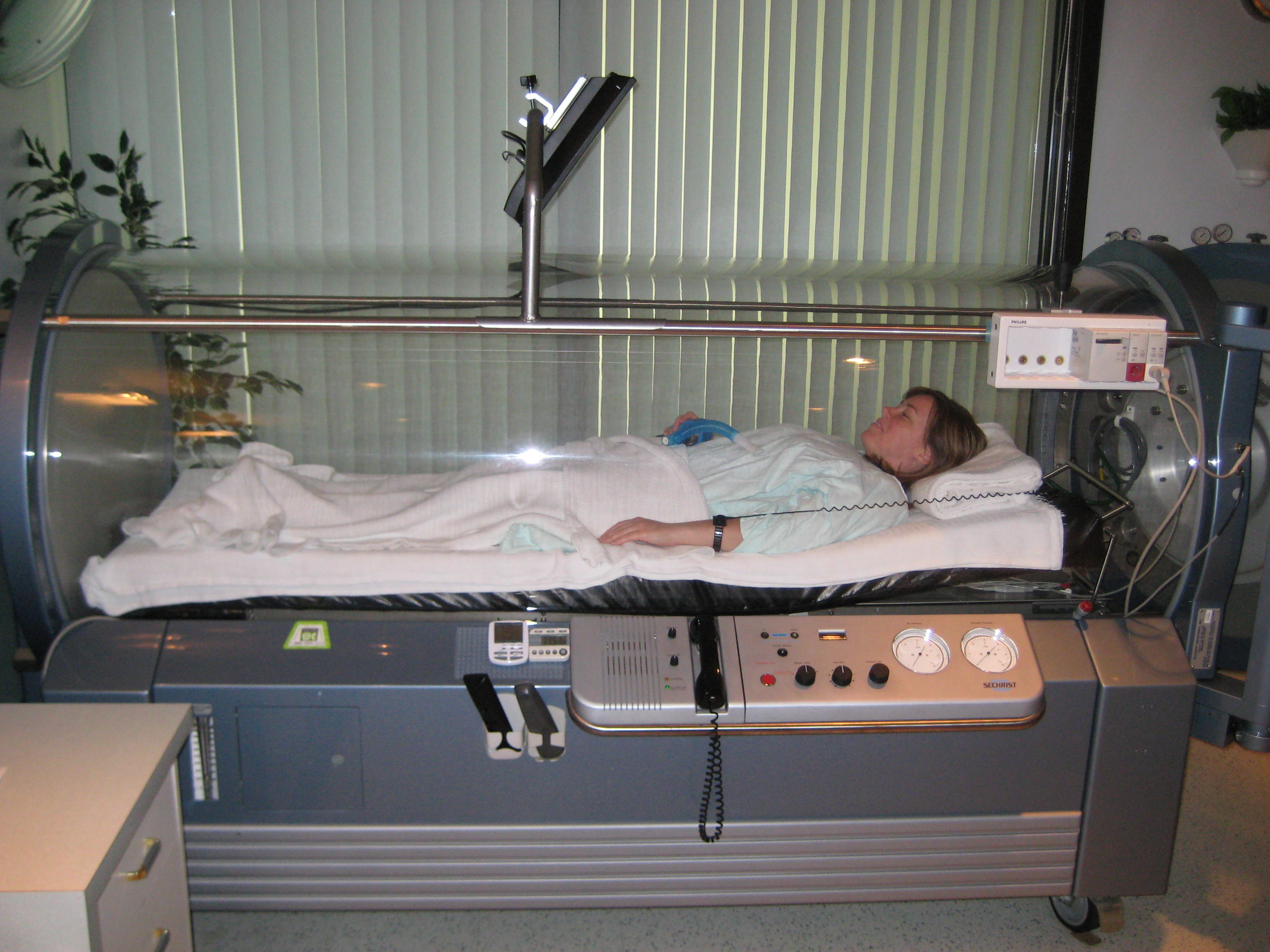
- A Sechrist Monoplace hyperbaric oxygen chamber at the Moose Jaw Union Hospital, Saskatchewan, Canada
- Specialty: Diving medicine, emergency medicine, neurology, infectious diseases
- ICD-9-CM: 93.95
- MeSH: D006931
- OPS-301 code: 8-721
- MedlinePlus: 002375

Hyperbaric medicine is the branch of medicine in which clinical therapies are delivered in pressurized vessels containing prescribed barometric pressures of gases such as air or oxygen. The immediate effects include reducing the size of gas emboli and raising the partial pressures of the gases present. Initial uses were in decompression sickness, and it is also effective in certain cases of gas gangrene and carbon monoxide poisoning. There are risks associated with hyperbaric therapy, including barotrauma, and, if pure oxygen is used, a fire hazard.

Hyperbaric oxygen therapy (HBOT) is the medical use of greater than 99% oxygen at an ambient pressure higher than atmospheric pressure, and therapeutic recompression. The equipment required consists of a pressure vessel for human occupancy (hyperbaric chamber), which may be of rigid or flexible construction, and a means of a controlled atmosphere supply. Treatment gas may be the ambient chamber gas, or delivered via a built-in breathing system. Operation is performed to a predetermined schedule by personnel who may adjust the schedule as required.

Hyperbaric air (HBA) consists of compressed atmospheric air (79% nitrogen, 21% oxygen, and minor gases) and is used for acute mountain sickness. This is applied by placing the person in a portable hyperbaric air chamber and inflating that chamber up to 14–28 kilopascals (2–4 psi) using a foot-operated or electric air pump.

Chambers used in the US made for hyperbaric medicine fall under the jurisdiction of the federal Food and Drug Administration (FDA). The FDA requires hyperbaric chambers to comply with the American Society of Mechanical Engineers PVHO Codes and the National Fire Protection Association Standard 99, Health Care Facilities Code. Similar conditions apply in most other countries.

Other uses include arterial gas embolism caused by pulmonary barotrauma of ascent. In emergencies divers may sometimes be treated by in-water recompression (when a chamber is not available) if suitable diving equipment (to reasonably secure the airway) is available.

== Scope ==
Hyperbaric medicine includes hyperbaric oxygen treatment, which is the medical use of oxygen at greater than atmospheric pressure to increase the availability of oxygen in the body; and therapeutic recompression, which involves increasing the ambient pressure on a person, usually a diver, to treat decompression sickness or an air embolism by reducing the volume and more rapidly eliminating bubbles that have formed within the body.

== Medical uses ==
The Undersea and Hyperbaric Medical Society (UHMS) lists 15 supported uses as of 2025:

1. Air or gas embolism;
2. Carbon monoxide poisoning including that complicated by cyanide poisoning;
3. Clostridal myositis and myonecrosis (gas gangrene);
4. Crush injury, compartment syndrome, and other acute traumatic ischemias;
5. Decompression sickness;
6. Central retinal artery occlusion and enhancement of healing in selected problem wounds due to insufficient arterial blood flow, including the diabetic foot;
7. Exceptional blood loss (anemia);
8. Intracranial abscess;
9. Necrotizing soft tissue infections (necrotizing fasciitis);
10. Osteomyelitis (refractory);
11. Delayed radiation injury (soft tissue and bony necrosis);
12. Skin grafts and flaps (compromised);
13. Thermal burns (early);
14. Idiopathic sudden sensorineural hearing loss;
15. Avascular necrosis

These uses are similar to those approved by the US FDA as of 2021.

Mucormycosis, especially rhinocerebral disease in the setting of diabetes mellitus may be supported.

Treatment efficacy of HBOT for most of these conditions is based on testing at 2–3 bar (atmospheres of pressure), but it is also marketed at lower pressures (and lower costs) despite lack of evidence of efficacy.

There is insufficient evidence for use in autism, cancer, diabetes, HIV/AIDS, Alzheimer's, asthma, Bell's palsy, cerebral palsy, depression, heart disease, migraines, multiple sclerosis, Parkinson's, spinal cord injury, sports injuries, or stroke. Furthermore, potential side effects pose an unjustified risk in such cases. A 2016 meta-analysis found no evidence of improvements in social abilities or cognitive functioning in autistic individuals treated with HBOT. The paper also noted conducting further trials would be ethically fraught, as studies had not revealed efficacy, but documented that HBOT can cause minor-grade ear barotrauma events. Despite the lack of evidence of benefit, in 2015, the number of people utilizing this therapy has continued to rise. There is also insufficient evidence to support its use in acute traumatic or surgical wounds.

=== Hearing ===
There is limited evidence for sudden sensorineural hearing loss when implemented within two weeks of onset. It might improve tinnitus presenting in the same time frame.

=== Chronic ulcers ===
HBOT in diabetic foot ulcers increased the rate of early ulcer healing but does not appear to provide any benefit in wound healing at long-term follow-up. In particular, there was no difference in major amputation rate. For venous, arterial and pressure ulcers, no evidence was apparent that HBOT provides a long-term improvement over standard treatment.

=== Radiation injury ===
There is some evidence that HBOT is effective for late radiation tissue injury of bone and soft tissues of the head and neck. Some people with radiation injuries of the head, neck or bowel show an improvement in quality of life. Importantly, no such effect has been found in neurological tissues. The use of HBOT may be justified to selected patients and tissues, but further research is required to establish the best people to treat and timing of any HBO therapy.

=== Neuro-rehabilitation ===
As of 2012, there was insufficient evidence to support use in traumatic brain injuries. In acute stroke, HBOT does not show benefit.

HBOT in multiple sclerosis has not shown benefit and routine use is not recommended.

A 2007 review in cerebral palsy found no difference compared to the control group. Neuropsychological tests also showed no difference between HBOT and room air and based on caregiver report, those who received room air had significantly better mobility and social functioning. Children experienced seizures and the need for tympanostomy tubes to equalize ear pressure, though the rates was not clear.

=== Cancer ===
In alternative medicine, hyperbaric medicine has been promoted for cancer. However, a 2011 study by the American Cancer Society reported no evidence it is effective for this purpose. A 2012 review article found "there is no evidence indicating that HBO neither acts as a stimulator of tumor growth nor as an enhancer of recurrence. On the other hand, there is evidence that implies that HBO might have tumor-inhibitory effects in certain cancer subtypes, and we thus strongly believe that we need to expand our knowledge on the effect and the mechanisms behind tumor oxygenation."

=== Migraines ===
Low-quality evidence suggests it may reduce pain in an ongoing migraine headache. It is not known which people would benefit from this treatment, and there is no evidence that it prevents future migraines.

== Side effects ==
Oxygen toxicity is a limitation on both maximum partial pressure of oxygen, and on length of each treatment.

A 2023 review found that negative outcomes (predominantly mild barotrauma (air pressure effect on ear or lung) that could be resolved spontaneously) were experienced by 24% of patients, but they were not prevented from completing the treatment regimen, and no serious side effects, complications or deaths were reported.

=== Complications ===
There are risks associated with HBOT, similar to some diving disorders. Pressure changes can cause a "squeeze" or barotrauma in the tissues surrounding trapped air inside the body, such as the lungs, behind the eardrum, inside paranasal sinuses, or trapped underneath dental fillings. Breathing high-pressure oxygen may cause oxygen toxicity. Temporarily blurred vision can be caused by swelling of the lens, which usually resolves in two to four weeks.

HBOT can accelerate the development of cataracts over multiple repetitive treatments. There are reports that cataracts may progress following HBOT, and rarely, may develop de novo, but this may be unrecognized and under reported. The cause is not fully explained, but evidence suggests that lifetime exposure of the lens to high partial pressure oxygen may be a major factor. Oxidative damage to lens proteins is thought to be responsible. This may be an end-stage of the relatively well documented "myopic shift" detected in most hyperbaric patients after a course of multiple treatments.

=== Ears ===
People have ear discomfort as a pressure difference develops between their middle ear and the chamber atmosphere. This can be relieved by ear clearing using the Valsalva maneuver or other techniques. Continued increase of pressure without equalizing may cause ear drums to rupture, resulting in severe pain. As the pressure in the chamber increases further, the air may become warm.

To reduce the pressure, a valve is opened to allow air out of the chamber. As the pressure falls, the patient's ears may "squeak" as the pressure inside the ear equalizes with the chamber. The temperature in the chamber will fall. The speed of pressurization and de-pressurization can be adjusted to each patient's needs.

=== Contraindications ===
The toxicology of the treatment has been reviewed by Ustundag et al. and its risk management is discussed by Christian R. Mortensen, in light of the fact that most hyperbaric facilities are managed by departments of anaesthesiology and some of their patients are critically ill.

An absolute contraindication to hyperbaric oxygen therapy is untreated pneumothorax. The reason is concern that it can progress to tension pneumothorax, especially during the decompression phase of therapy, although treatment on oxygen-based tables may avoid that progression. The COPD patient with a large bleb represents a relative contraindication for similar reasons. Also, the treatment may raise the issue of occupational health and safety (OHS), for chamber inside attendants, who should not be compressed if they are unable to equalise ears and sinuses.

Extra care may be required in people with:

- Cardiovascular disease
- COPD with air trapping – can lead to pneumothorax during treatment.
- Upper respiratory infections – These conditions can make it difficult for the patient to equalise their ears or sinuses, which can result in what is termed ear or sinus squeeze.
- High fevers – In most cases the fever should be lowered before HBO treatment begins. Fevers may predispose to convulsions.
- Emphysema with CO_{2} retention – This condition can lead to pneumothorax during HBO treatment due to rupture of an emphysematous bulla during decompression. This risk can be evaluated by x-ray.
- History of thoracic (chest) surgery – This is rarely a problem and usually not considered a contraindication. However, there is concern that air may be trapped in lesions that were created by surgical scarring. These conditions need to be evaluated prior to considering HBO therapy.
- Malignant disease: Cancers thrive in blood-rich environments but may be suppressed by high oxygen levels. HBO treatment of individuals who have cancer presents a problem, since HBO both increases blood flow via angiogenesis and also raises oxygen levels. Taking an anti-angiogenic supplement may provide a solution. A study by Feldemier, et al. and NIH funded study on Stem Cells by Thom, et al., indicate that HBO is actually beneficial in producing stem/progenitor cells and the malignant process is not accelerated.
- Middle ear barotrauma may occur in children and adults in a hyperbaric environment because of the necessity to equalise pressure in the ears.

Pregnancy is not a relative contraindication to hyperbaric oxygen treatments, although it may be for underwater diving. In cases where a pregnant woman has carbon monoxide poisoning there is evidence that lower pressure (2.0 ATA) HBOT treatments are not harmful to the fetus, and that the risk involved is outweighed by the greater risk of the untreated effects of CO on the fetus (neurologic abnormalities or death.) In pregnant patients, HBO therapy has been shown to be safe for the fetus when given at appropriate levels and "doses" (durations). In fact, pregnancy lowers the threshold for HBO treatment of carbon monoxide-exposed patients. This is due to the high affinity of fetal hemoglobin for CO.

== Mechanism of action ==
The therapeutic consequences of HBOT and recompression result from multiple effects.

=== Pressure ===
The increased overall pressure is of therapeutic value in the treatment of decompression sickness and air embolism as it provides a physical means of reducing the volume of inert gas bubbles within the body; Exposure to this increased pressure is maintained for a period long enough to ensure that most of the bubble gas is dissolved back into the tissues, removed by perfusion and eliminated in the lungs.

The improved concentration gradient for inert gas elimination (oxygen window) by using a high partial pressure of oxygen increases the rate of inert gas elimination in the treatment of decompression sickness.

For many other conditions, the therapeutic principle of HBOT lies in its ability to drastically increase partial pressure of oxygen in the tissues of the body. The oxygen partial pressures achievable using HBOT are much higher than those achievable while breathing pure oxygen under normobaric conditions (i.e. at normal atmospheric pressure). This effect is achieved by an increase in the oxygen transport capacity of the blood. At normal atmospheric pressure, oxygen transport is limited by the oxygen binding capacity of hemoglobin in red blood cells and very little oxygen is transported by blood plasma. Because the hemoglobin of the red blood cells is almost saturated with oxygen at atmospheric pressure, this route of transport cannot be exploited any further. Oxygen transport by plasma, however, is significantly increased using HBOT because of the higher solubility of oxygen as pressure increases.

== Hyperbaric chambers ==
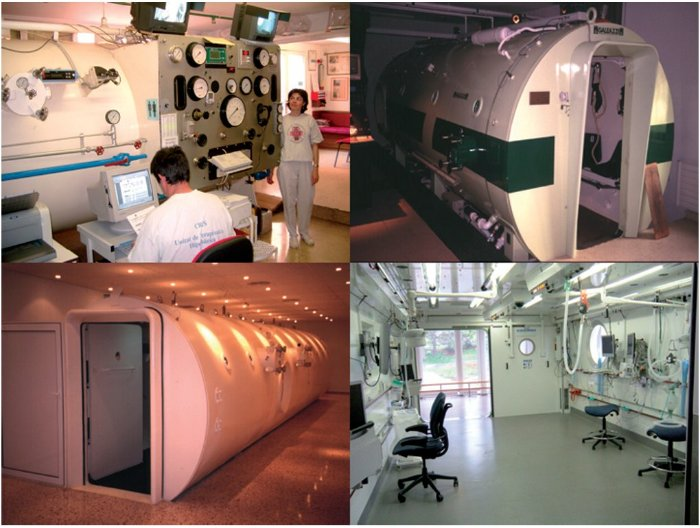
Multiplace hyperbaric chambers, showing control panel, monitoring facilities, and different chamber sizes in Spanish facilities

=== Construction ===
The traditional type of hyperbaric chamber used for therapeutic recompression and HBOT is a rigid shelled pressure vessel. Such chambers can be run at absolute pressures typically about 6 bars (87 psi), 600,000 Pa or more in special cases. Navies, professional diving organizations, hospitals, and dedicated recompression facilities typically operate these. They range in size from semi-portable, one-patient units to room-sized units that can treat eight or more patients. The larger units may be rated for lower pressures if they are not primarily intended for treatment of diving injuries.

A rigid chamber may consist of:

- a pressure vessel designed to a code such as ASME Boiler and Pressure Vessel Code
- viewports to allow the medical personnel to visually monitor the occupants, and can be used for hand signaling as an auxiliary emergency communications method. The major components are the window (transparent acrylic), the window seat (holds the acrylic window), and retaining ring. Interior lighting can be provided by mounting lights outside the viewports. Viewports are a feature specific to PVHOs due to the need to see the people inside and evaluate their health. Other materials have been attempted, but they consistently fail to maintain their seal or have cracks which would progress rapidly to catastrophic failure. Acrylic is more likely to have small cracks the operators can see and have time to take mitigation steps instead of failing catastrophically. Counterfeit chambers often do not use acrylic windows.
- one or more human entry hatches – small and circular or wheel-in type hatches for patients on gurneys;
- the entry lock that allows human entry – a separate chamber with two hatches, one to the outside and one to the main chamber, which can be independently pressurized to allow patients to enter or exit the main chamber while it is still pressurized;
- a low volume medical or service airlock for medicines, instruments, and food;
- transparent ports or closed-circuit television that allows technicians and medical staff outside the chamber to monitor the patient inside the chamber;
- an intercom system allowing two-way communication;
- an optional carbon dioxide scrubber – consisting of a fan that passes the gas inside the chamber through a soda lime canister;
- a control panel outside the chamber to open and close valves that control air flow to and from the chamber, and regulate oxygen to hoods or masks;
- an over-pressure relief valve;
- a built-in breathing system (BIBS) to supply and exhaust treatment gas;
- a fire suppression system.

Flexible monoplace chambers are available ranging from collapsible flexible aramid fiber-reinforced chambers which can be disassembled for transport via truck or SUV, with a maximum working pressure of 2 bar above ambient complete with BIBS allowing full oxygen treatment schedules. to portable, air inflated "soft" chambers that can operate at between 0.3 and 0.5 bars (4.4 and 7.3 psi) above atmospheric pressure with no supplemental oxygen, and longitudinal zipper closure.

==== Viewports ====
Acrylic windows with PVHO-1 defined standard geometries and design criteria are generally used. Shapes and sizes vary with chamber application and the requirements for the specific use.

The geometries in general use include:

- Flat circular windows (low pressure)
- Conical edged windows with flat inner and outer faces (high pressure on one side only)
- Circular windows with double beveled edges
- Light pipes

Low pressure, small diameter chambers may use large cylindrical windows fitted inside the metal structure. In some cases the whole cylindrical pressure chamber has been made from an acrylic tube.

The acrylic windows of a hyperbaric chamber have a limited lifespan, which can be expressed as the design life, which is the conservatively estimated life as calculated in the design process, typically about 10 years, and the service life, which is the actual time the window can be safely and legally used when well maintained, properly inspected, and repaired when necessary and possible and which can be as much as twice the design life.

There are three grades of inspection required:

- Operational inspection of the inner and outer surfaces is included in the checks before first pressurisation of the day by a competent chamber operator, and ensures that the surfaces have not been damaged since the last use.
- Maintenance inspection is done at specified intervals by a qualified maintenance inspector. This inspection is more thorough and may require removal of the window from the mounting to check for damage that is not visible when installed. This grade of inspection is generally also required for re-commissioning a chamber that has been out of service for longer than a specified period.
- Seat and seal inspection is done whenever a window has been removed for inspection or repair or a new window installed.

The window is examined to detect crazing, cracks, blisters, discolouration, scratches or pits.

==== Operating pressures ====
The operating pressure depends on the application. Chambers used for clinical hyperbaric oxygen therapy commonly have a maximum allowable working pressure of 35 pounds per square inch (2.4 bar) with a maximum of about 150 pounds per square inch (10 bar) Chambers used for support of commercial or military diving operations and for research may have a maximum allowable working pressure of up to 1,000 pounds per square inch (69 bar).

=== Oxygen supply ===
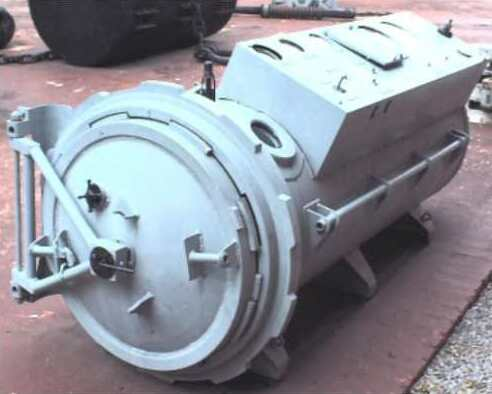
A recompression chamber for a single diving casualty

In the larger multiplace chambers, patients inside the chamber breathe from either "oxygen hoods" – flexible, transparent soft plastic hoods with a seal around the neck similar to a space suit helmet – or tightly fitting oxygen masks, which supply pure oxygen and may be designed to directly exhaust the exhaled gas from the chamber. During treatment patients breathe 100% oxygen most of the time to maximise the effectiveness of their treatment, but have periodic "air breaks" during which they breathe chamber air (21% oxygen) to reduce the risk of oxygen toxicity. The exhaled treatment gas must be removed from the chamber to prevent the buildup of oxygen, which could present a fire risk. Attendants may also breathe oxygen some of the time to reduce their risk of decompression sickness when they leave the chamber. The pressure inside the chamber is increased by opening valves allowing high-pressure air to enter from storage cylinders, which are filled by an air compressor. Chamber air oxygen content is kept between 19% and 23% to control fire risk (US Navy maximum 25%). If the chamber does not have a scrubber system to remove carbon dioxide from the chamber gas, the chamber must be isobarically ventilated to keep the CO_{2} within acceptable limits.

A soft chamber may be pressurized directly from a compressor. or from storage cylinders.

Smaller "monoplace" chambers can only accommodate the patient, and no medical staff can enter. The chamber may be pressurised with pure oxygen or compressed air. If pure oxygen is used, no oxygen breathing mask or helmet is needed, but the cost of using pure oxygen is much higher than that of using compressed air. If compressed air is used, then an oxygen mask or hood is needed as in a multiplace chamber. Most monoplace chambers can be fitted with a demand breathing system for air breaks. In low pressure soft chambers, treatment schedules may not require air breaks, because the risk of oxygen toxicity is low due to the lower oxygen partial pressures used (usually 1.3 ATA), and short duration of treatment.

For alert, cooperative patients, air breaks provided by mask are more effective than changing the chamber gas because they provide a quicker gas change and a more reliable gas composition both during the break and treatment periods.

=== Personnel ===
- Diving medical practitioner – a specialist in diving medicine
- Chamber operator – a person competent to operate a hyperbaric chamber
- Hyperbaric nurse – a nurse responsible for administering hyperbaric oxygen therapy to patients and supervising them throughout the treatment.
- Diving medical technician – member of a dive team who is trained in advanced first aid.
- Hyperbaric medical practitioner – a specialist in hyperbaric medicine
- Chamber attendant – a person trained in basic first aid who is medically fit to dive in a chamber, usually a member of a diving team allocated to looking after the diver being treated.

== Treatments ==
Initially, HBOT was developed as a treatment for diving disorders involving bubbles of gas in the tissues, such as decompression sickness and gas embolism, It is still considered the definitive treatment for these conditions. The chamber treats decompression sickness and gas embolism by increasing pressure, reducing the size of the gas bubbles and improving the transport of blood to downstream tissues. After elimination of bubbles, the pressure is gradually reduced back to atmospheric levels. Hyperbaric chambers are also used for animals.

As of September 2023, a number of hyperbaric chambers in the US are turning divers with decompression sickness away, and only treating more profitable scheduled cases. The number of hyperbaric medical facilities in the US is estimated at about 1500, of which 67 are treating diving accidents, according to Divers Alert Network. Many facilities only provide hyperbaric treatment for wound care for economic reasons. Emergency hyperbaric services are more expensive to train and staff, and liability is increased.

=== Protocol ===
Emergency HBOT for decompression illness follows treatment schedules laid out in treatment tables. Most cases employ a recompression to 2.8 bars (41 psi) absolute, the equivalent of 18 metres (60 ft) of water, for 4.5 to 5.5 hours with the casualty breathing pure oxygen, but taking air breaks every 20 minutes to reduce oxygen toxicity. For extremely serious cases resulting from very deep dives, the treatment may require a chamber capable of a maximum pressure of 8 bars (120 psi), the equivalent of 70 metres (230 ft) of water, and the ability to supply heliox as a breathing gas.

U.S. Navy treatment charts are used in Canada and the United States to determine the duration, pressure, and breathing gas of the therapy. The most frequently used tables are Table 5 and Table 6. In the UK the Royal Navy 62 and 67 tables are used.

The Undersea and Hyperbaric Medical Society (UHMS) publishes a report that compiles the latest research findings and contains information regarding the recommended duration and pressure of the longer-term conditions.

=== Home and out-patient ===
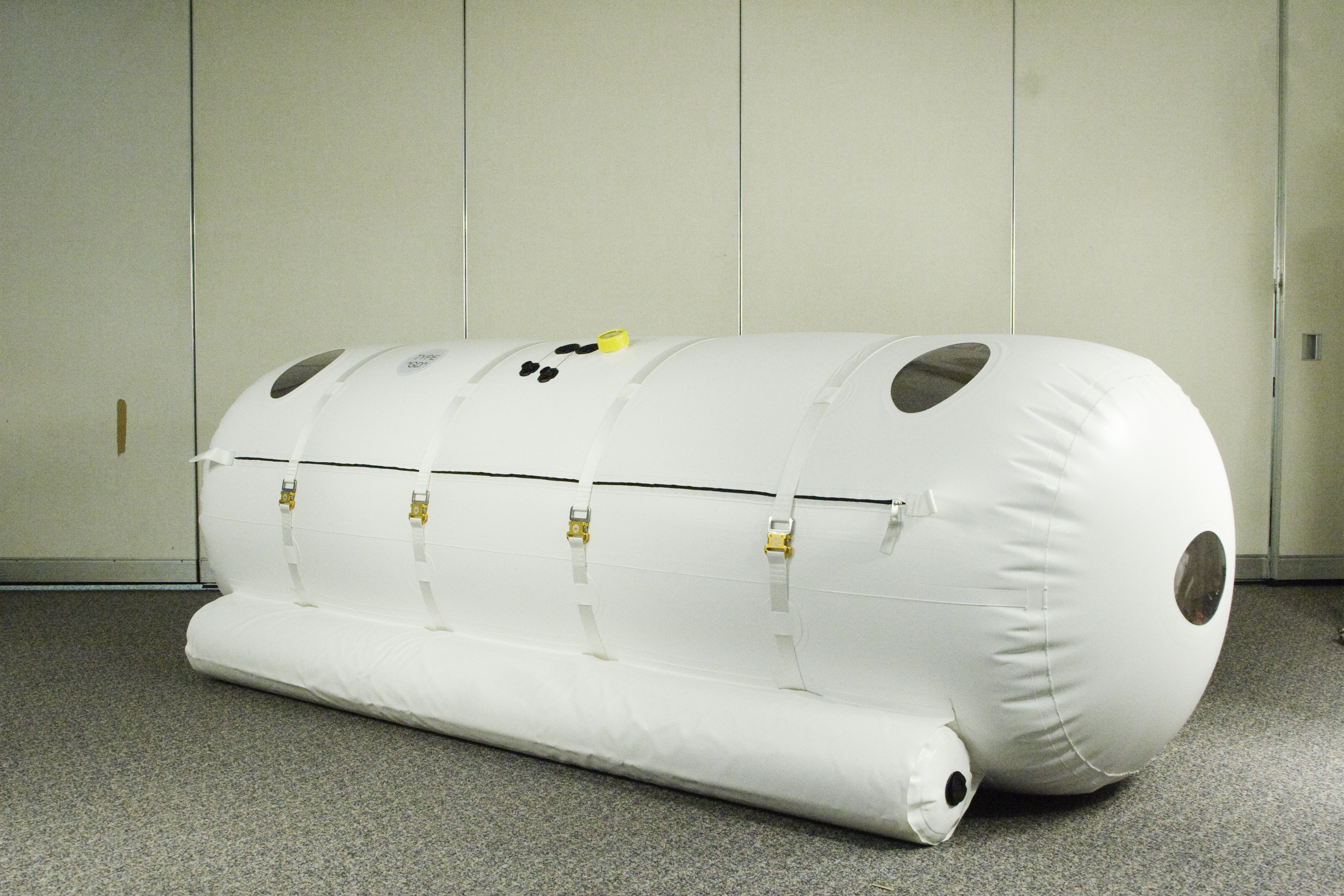
An example of mild portable hyperbaric chamber. This 40-inch-diameter (1,000 mm) chamber is one of the larger chambers available for home.

There are several sizes of portable chambers, which are used for home treatment. These are usually referred to as "mild personal hyperbaric chambers", which is a reference to the lower pressure (compared to hard chambers) of soft-sided chambers. The American Medical Association is opposed to home use or any other use of hyperbaric chambers if it is not "in facilities with appropriately trained staff including physician supervision and prescription and only when the intervention has scientific support or rationale" due demonstrated hazard

In the US, these "mild personal hyperbaric chambers" are categorized by the FDA as CLASS II medical devices and requires a prescription in order to purchase one or take treatments. As with any hyperbaric chamber, the FDA require compliance with ASME and NFPA standards. The most common option (but not approved by FDA) some patients choose is to acquire an oxygen concentrator which typically delivers 85–96% oxygen as the breathing gas.

Oxygen is never fed directly into soft chambers but is rather introduced via a line and mask directly to the patient. FDA approved oxygen concentrators for human consumption in confined areas used for HBOT are regularly monitored for purity (±1%) and flow (10 to 15 liters per minute outflow pressure). An audible alarm will sound if the purity ever drops below 80%. Personal hyperbaric chambers use 120 volt or 220 volt outlets. The FDA warns against the use of oxygen concentrators or oxygen tanks with chambers that does not meet ASME and FDA standards, regardless of if the concentrators are FDA approved.

== History ==
=== Hyperbaric air ===
A British physician, Nathaniel Henshaw, proposed what would have been the first hyperbaric chamber for medical treatment of humans in 1662. The container was to have been pressurised with air, which at the time was not yet known to contain oxygen, later discovered by Carl Wilhelm Scheele around 1770 and first published by Joseph Priestley in 1775, or carbon dioxide. Although it is widely accepted that the chamber was built and used, there are inconsistencies in the description of the engineering details of construction and use that make it very unlikely that it would have been able to seal or withstand the forces involved, and the procedures described would have been hazardous.

Victot T. Junod built a chamber in France in 1834 to treat pulmonary conditions at pressures between 2 and 4 atmospheres absolute.

During the following century "pneumatic centres" were established in Europe and the USA which used hyperbaric air to treat a variety of conditions.

Orval J Cunningham, a professor of anesthesia at the University of Kansas in the early 1900s observed that people with circulatory disorders did better at sea level than at altitude and this formed the basis for his use of hyperbaric air. In 1918, he successfully treated patients with the Spanish flu with hyperbaric air. In 1930 the American Medical Association forced him to stop hyperbaric treatment, since he did not provide acceptable evidence that the treatments were effective.

=== Hyperbaric oxygen ===
The English scientist Joseph Priestley discovered oxygen in 1775. Shortly after its discovery, there were reports of toxic effects of hyperbaric oxygen on the central nervous system and lungs, which delayed therapeutic applications until 1937, when Behnke and Shaw first used it in the treatment of decompression sickness.

In 1955 and 1956 Churchill-Davidson, in the UK, used hyperbaric oxygen to enhance the radiosensitivity of tumours, while Ite Boerema, at the University of Amsterdam, successfully used it in cardiac surgery.

In 1961 Willem Hendrik Brummelkamp et al. published on the use of hyperbaric oxygen in the treatment of clostridial gas gangrene.

In 1962 Smith and Sharp reported successful treatment of carbon monoxide poisoning with hyperbaric oxygen.

The Undersea Medical Society (now Undersea and Hyperbaric Medical Society) formed a Committee on Hyperbaric Oxygenation which has become recognized as the authority on indications for hyperbaric oxygen treatment.

=== Incidents ===
Fires inside a hyperbaric chamber are extremely dangerous. A review article published in 1997 found 77 human fatalities in 35 different hyperbaric chamber fires that occurred from 1923 to 1996. Further studies indicate while the treatment is often considered safe, the use of hyperbaric equipment comes with risks to the operating personnel when improperly used. Proper equipment maintenance and safety procedures for the use of pressure equipment is mandatory.

- 1997: Ten patients and a nurse were killed in Milan, Italy after a fire broke out inside a hyperbaric oxygen chamber.
- 2009: A grandmother and her four year old grandson died after a hyperbaric chamber caught fire and exploded in Florida. The boy was receiving treatment in the chamber for cerebral palsy and had traveled from Italy where the treatment is outlawed to undergo the procedure.
- 2012: A hyperbaric oxygen chamber exploded in Florida, killing a woman and a thoroughbred horse who was receiving treatment. The explosion occurred after the horse kicked out at the chamber, creating sparks which ignited a fire.
- 2015: A dog was killed in Georgia when the chamber it was receiving treatment in caught fire and exploded. The dog was being treated for arthritis.
- 2016: A fire killed four people who were receiving treatment inside a hyperbaric chamber at Mintohardjo Navy Hospital in Jakarta, Indonesia. The fire was reportedly caused by an electrical short circuit. After the fire broke out, operators used a sprinkler system and an emergency shut off system to rescue the victims, but live-saving efforts were prevented as the machine became engulfed in flames.
- 2016: A man in Victoria, Australia died in a hyperbaric chamber of undisclosed causes while receiving treatment. The practitioners overseeing his care were found responsible for failing to ensure the patient's safety leading to his death. They were later fined AU$716,750.
- March 2025: A hyperbaric chamber exploded in Michigan, killing a five year old boy.
- July 2025: On Wednesday, July 9, 43-year-old physical therapist Walter Foxcroft was found dead inside a hyperbaric oxygen chamber at his health clinic in Lake Havasu City, Arizona, after the device caught fire.

== Society and culture ==
=== Regulation ===
The use of hyperbaric chambers for medical and therapeutic procedures is generally regulated. Authorities have warned of potential risks to patients receiving treatment in unlicensed facilities, notably in Israel, Canada, and the United States. In Italy, the use of hyperbaric chambers for therapy was severely restricted to limited medical settings after a serious fire which killed ten patients in 1997.

In some jurisdictions, the use and availability of HBOT is further restricted at the subnational level. In the U.S. state of North Carolina, several cities including Durham, Raleigh and Charlotte have ordered operators of mild hyperbaric oxygen therapy to close to protect public safety due to a risk of fire.

Unlicensed and fraudulent operators have been subject to prosecution. In Australia, Oxymed Australia Pty. Ltd. and director Malcolm Hooper were ordered to pay AUS $3 million in fines after advertising hyperbaric therapy against the country's Therapeutic Goods Act. In Canada, certain soft-shelled hyperbaric chambers were removed from the market for a potential risk to patients.

=== Costs ===
HBOT is recognized by Medicare in the United States as a reimbursable treatment for 14 UHMS "approved" conditions. A 1-hour HBOT session may cost between $300 and higher in private clinics, and over $2,000 in hospitals. U.S. physicians (M.D. or D.O.) may lawfully prescribe HBOT for "off-label" conditions such as stroke, and migraine. Such patients are treated in outpatient clinics. In the United Kingdom most chambers are financed by the National Health Service, although some, such as those run by Multiple Sclerosis Therapy Centres, are non-profit. In Australia, HBOT is not covered by Medicare as a treatment for multiple sclerosis. China and Russia treat more than 80 maladies, conditions, and trauma with HBOT.

== Research ==
Aspects under research include radiation-induced hemorrhagic cystitis; and inflammatory bowel disease, rejuvenation.

Some research found evidence that HBOT improves local tumor control, mortality, and local tumor recurrence for cancers of the head and neck.

Some research also found evidence of an increase in stem progenitor cells and a decrease in inflammation.

=== Neurological ===
Tentative evidence shows a possible benefit in cerebrovascular diseases. Rats subjected to HBOT after some time following the acute phase of experimentally-induced stroke showed reduced inflammation, increased brain-derived neurotrophic factor, and evidence of neurogenesis. Another rat study showed improved neurofunctional recovery as well as neurogenesis following the late-chronic phase of experimentally-induced stroke.

The clinical experience and results so far published has promoted the use of HBOT therapy in patients with cerebrovascular injury and focal cerebrovascular injuries. However, the power of clinical research is limited because of the shortage of randomized controlled trials.

=== Radiation wounds ===
A 2010 review of wounds from radiation therapy found that, while most studies suggest a benefit, more experimental research is needed to validate its use.

=== Respiratory distress ===
People who are having extreme difficulty breathing – acute respiratory distress syndrome – are commonly given oxygen and there have been limited trials of hyperbaric equipment in such cases. Examples include treatment of the Spanish flu and COVID-19.

== See also ==
- Undersea and Hyperbaric Medical Society – US based hyperbaric research organization
- South Pacific Underwater Medicine Society – Publisher for diving and hyperbaric medicine and physiology
- Decompression chamber – Any pressure vessel for human occupancy used to decompress a person
- Hyperbaric treatment schedules – Planned hyperbaric exposure using a specified breathing gas as medical treatment
- Transdermal continuous oxygen therapy – Wound closure technique using external oxygen exposure
