= Stephen Skinner (lexicographer) =

Stephen Skinner (1623–1667) was an English Lincoln physician, lexicographer and etymologist.

== Life ==
He was the son of John Skinner of London. He matriculated at Christ Church, Oxford, on 6 December 1639; but when the First English Civil War broke out, he left England.

In 1646 Skinner was again at Oxford, and in consideration of his foreign service he was allowed to accumulate both his arts degrees in that same year, graduating B.A. on 21 October and M.A. on 10 November. On 22 April 1649 he entered as a medical student at Leiden University, on 6 May 1653 at the University of Heidelberg, and on 4 November 1653 was again at Leyden. At the beginning of 1654 he graduated M.D. at Heidelberg, and on 26 May of that year was incorporated in the same degree at Oxford.

Skinner was made honorary fellow of the London College of Physicians in December 1664. He practised in Lincoln where he died of malignant fever on 5 September 1667. Administration of his estate was granted to his sister, Elizabeth Bowyer, and his daughter Stephanie Skinner, on 7 September 1667.

== Works ==
Skinner left behind him some philological treatises in manuscript, and they were edited by Thomas Henshaw and published in London in 1671, under the title of Etymologicon Linguæ Anglicanæ. This work was the first important etymological dictionary of English. Appearing three years before John Ray's glossary of English dialects, Skinner's dictionary presents a number of dialectal expressions of his native Lincolnshire.

Samuel Johnson acknowledged his indebtedness to Skinner in the preface to his Dictionary (1755).

== Notes ==
Attribution

This article incorporates text from a publication now in the public domain: "Skinner, Stephen". Dictionary of National Biography. London: Smith, Elder & Co. 1885–1900.
