= Twickenham Park =

Estate in London, England

Coordinates: 51.455°N 0.320°W

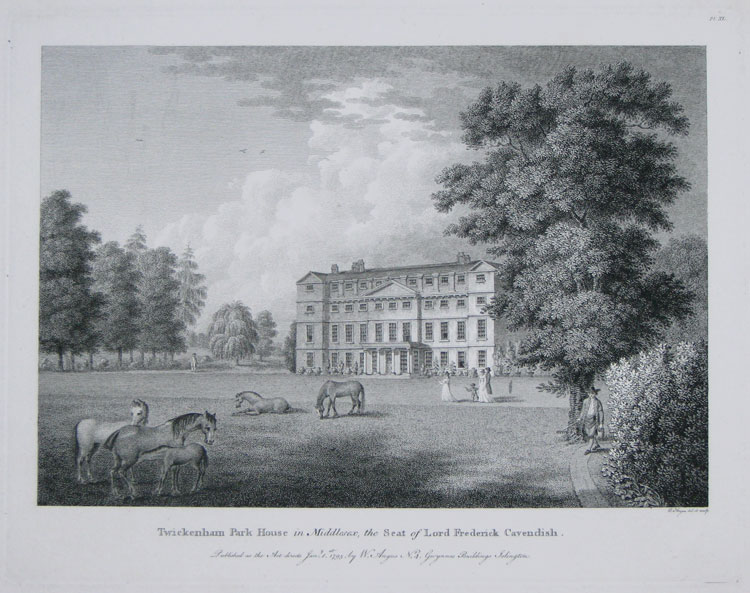
Twickenham Park House in 1795

Twickenham Park was a latterly large house and a farmland/parkland overspilling the north east of Twickenham in Middlesex (a county abolished so in today's outer south-west London). The house was demolished in 1809.

== History ==
The New Park of Richmond, later called Twickenham Park, passed to Edward Bacon in 1574 and to the English philosopher, Francis Bacon, in 1593. In 1608 the property passed to Lucy Russell, Countess of Bedford. The courtier and poet Cecily Bulstrode died at Twickenham Park on 4 August 1609. In 1618 the Countess Bedford gave it to a relative, Sir William Harrington, Member of Parliament for Hertford. Harrington sold it to Mary Home, Countess of Home, a cousin of Lady Bedford, in 1621.

The property was acquired from the Countess of Home by Sir Thomas Nott, a Royalist Army officer, in 1640. Nott remained there until 1659 when he sold it to a Mr Henry Murray. In 1668 Murray sold it to John Berkeley, 1st Baron Berkeley of Stratton, another Royalist Army officer, who died in 1678.

In 1685 the Berkeley family sold the property to Robert Brudenell, 2nd Earl of Cardigan. The property was then bought by Sir Thomas Vernon, Member of Parliament for Whitchurch, in 1698 and by Algernon Coote, 6th Earl of Mountrath in 1743.

In 1766 the property passed to the Harriet Pelham-Holles, Duchess of Newcastle-upon-Tyne, who set about mixed farming in the park, and in 1788 it passed to Lord Frederick Cavendish, a British Army officer.

Following Cavendish's death in October 1803 the house passed to Sir William Abdy, 7th Baronet. Abdy sold the house at auction to Francis Gosling who in turn demolished it in 1809.

== Subsequent site use ==
The site is now mainly residential buildings with gardens, the rest given up for a two-track railway, Twickenham Studios, a supermarket, Twickenham Park Surgery and a community centre. It slightly straddled the pre-1931 Isleworth parish limits originally right up to its breakaway Lord Ailsa's celebrated grand house and grounds St Margarets (now a distinct 'district' of London) by an east-facing left bank of the Tidal Thames. As to limits it ran up the Thames briefly, then past the rear of the nascent buildings of the Richmond Bridge end of Richmond Road and then up to the road's long, gentle curve continuation that sweeps to the north (St Margarets Road, originally Park Road) to reach the mouth of the Crane. Ailsa House had been author and playwright Richard Brinsley Sheridan's house and had over 40 acres of gardens and orchards under Lord Ailsa's patronage.

== Sources ==
- "VERNON, Thomas (1666–1726), of Twickenham Park, Mdx." in Hayton, D W; Cruickshanks, Eveline; Handley, Stuart. (eds.) (2002) The History of Parliament: the House of Commons 1690–1715. Boydell and Brewer. ISBN 9780521772211
