= Cunningham Sanitarium =

Health institution in Cleveland, Ohio, U.S.

The Cunningham Sanitarium was a health institution in Cleveland, Ohio. Led by Dr. Orval J. Cunningham from the University of Kansas the facility was constructed to offer oxygen therapy on a large scale. The main structure for delivery of the treatment was a 900-ton steel sphere built in 1928. Consisting of five stories, the sphere stood at 64 feet and contained 38 rooms. 350 portholes helped to illuminate the rooms. The building was funded and built by the Timken Roller Bearing Company and linked to the three-story sanitarium hotel. It opened on December 1, 1928.

Dr. Cunningham chose to build the sanitarium at 18485 Lake Shore Boulevard near East 185th Street. The site, along the shore of Lake Erie, was chosen for its aesthetics. Dr. Cunningham believed that he could treat cancer and diabetes with hyperbaric medicine.

Dr. Cunningham sold the site to James Rand Jr., son of one of the co-founders of Remington Rand and protégé of Cunningham, in 1934. Rand reopened the buildings the following year as the Ohio Institute of Oxygen Therapy, making use of the unique facility. It did not last long and was soon turned into a general hospital under the name Boulevard Hospital. Financial problems led to its closure in 1937 and the site lay dormant until it was bought by the Roman Catholic Diocese of Cleveland. The Cunningham Sanitarium building was razed on March 31, 1942, and the steel was used in the war effort. In 1950 the ground on which the sphere stood was turned into a school, St. Joseph High School, now the Villa Angela-St. Joseph High School. The main building was used as a hospital, Catholic Youth Organization headquarters and orphanage before becoming the St. Joseph Christian Life Center. This building was razed in 2010 and the property is used for green space by the Hospice of the Western Reserve, which owns the land.
