= Francis Bramston =

English judge

Francis Bramston or Brampston (died 1683) was an English judge and Baron of the Exchequer.

== Life ==
Bramston, the third son of Sir John Bramston the elder, was educated at the school of Thomas Farnabie, in Goldsmiths' Alley, Cripplegate, and at Queens' College, Cambridge, where Edward Martin was then the President, graduating B.A. in 1637 and M.A. in 1640. He was admitted to the Middle Temple as a student in 1634, but as his health was weak he for a time entertained the idea of taking holy orders.

Shortly before the final rupture between the king and the parliament he was elected a Fellow of Queens' College, and after being called to the bar (14 June 1642) left the country. He spent the next four years (1642–46) travelling in France and Italy, falling in with John Evelyn and his friend Thomas Henshaw at Rome in the spring of 1645, and again at Padua and Venice in the autumn of 1645.

On his return to England Bramston devoted himself to the study and practice of the law. His history, however, is a blank until the Restoration, when he was made steward of some of the king's courts (probably manorial) in Essex, and of the liberty of Havering in the same county.

In 1664 he represented Queens' College, Cambridge, in the litigation respecting the election of Simon Patrick to the presidency, and in the following year was appointed one of the counsel to the university, with a fee of 40 shillings per annum. In 1668 he was elected one of the benchers of his inn, and appointed reader, his subject being the statute 3 Jac. c. 4, concerning popish recusants. The banquet which, according to custom, he gave on this occasion (3 August) is described by Evelyn, who was present, as "so very extravagant and great as the like hath not been seen at any time". He mentions the Duke of Ormonde, the lord privy seal Robartes, the Earl of Bedford, John Belasyse, 1st Baron Belasyse, and George Savile, 1st Viscount Halifax as among the guests, besides "a world more of earls and lords".

In Trinity term of the following year he was made serjeant-at-law, presenting the king with a ring inscribed with the motto, "Rex legis tutamen", and was appointed steward of the court of common pleas, with a salary of £100. per annum. In Trinity term 1678 he was created a baron of the exchequer, but early next year (29 April) was dismissed, without reason assigned, along with Sir William Wild of the king's bench, Sir Edward Thurland of the exchequer, and Vere Bertie of the common pleas, Sir Thomas Raymond being sworn in his place (5 May), though, according to his own account, he "had laboured, and not without great reason, to prevent it". It was supposed that either Sir William Temple or Lord-chancellor Finch was at the bottom of the affair. On 4 June a pension of £500 a year was granted him, of which the first three terminal instalments only were paid him. At his death, which occurred at his chambers in Serjeants' Inn 27 March 1683, it was three years and six months in arrear. He was buried 30 March in Roxwell Church in Essex.

He died heavily in debt, and his brother John, who was his executor, made persistent efforts to get in the amount due in respect of his pension (some £1,750), and succeeded in 1686 in recovering £1,456 5s., the balance being, as he plaintively puts it, abated in costs.

Sir Francis was never married. In person he was short and rather stout.
