= John Gisborne =

John Gisborne (c. 1717–1779) was a British politician who sat in the House of Commons from 1775 to 1776.

== Life ==
Gisborne was the only son of Thomas Gisborne of Derby and his wife Temperance Packer, daughter of Robert Packer MP of Shillingford, Berkshire. He married Anne Bateman, daughter of William Bateman of Derby. He succeeded his father to Yoxall in 1760.

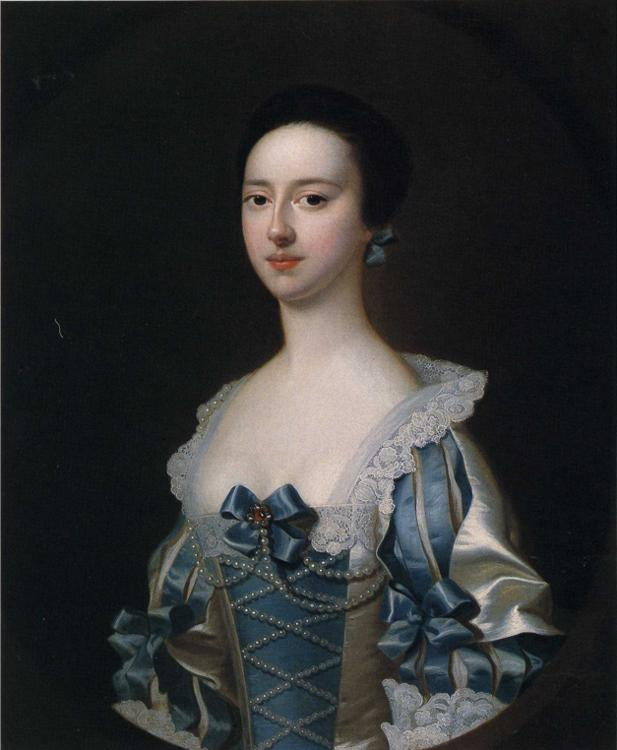
Anne Bateman, later Mrs. John Gisbourne (1755) by Joseph Wright

His wife was painted by Joseph Wright of Derby in 1755. Joseph Wright's father was a good friend of his father, Thomas Gisborne. He gave the painter three guineas. He was one of the first people to give Joseph Wright a paid commission.

Gisborne exercised political influence in Derby which he appears to have used on behalf of the Cavendishes for many years. He stood for Derby at a by-election on 30 January 1775 probably supported by Cavendish. He was returned as Member of Parliament, but petitions were submitted complaining that he exercised undue influence over the mayor. As a result of these, he was unseated on 8 February 1776.

Gisborne died on 13 February 1779, aged 62. His son Thomas was a clergyman and abolitionist, his son John was a poet and his daughter Temperance married Sir Hugh Bateman 1st Baronet.

Parliament of Great Britain
Preceded by Lord Frederick Cavendish; Wenman Coke	Member of Parliament for Derby; 1775–1776; With: Lord Frederick Cavendish	Succeeded by Daniel Coke; Lord Frederick Cavendish
