= John Finch (ambassador) =

English diplomat (1626–1682)

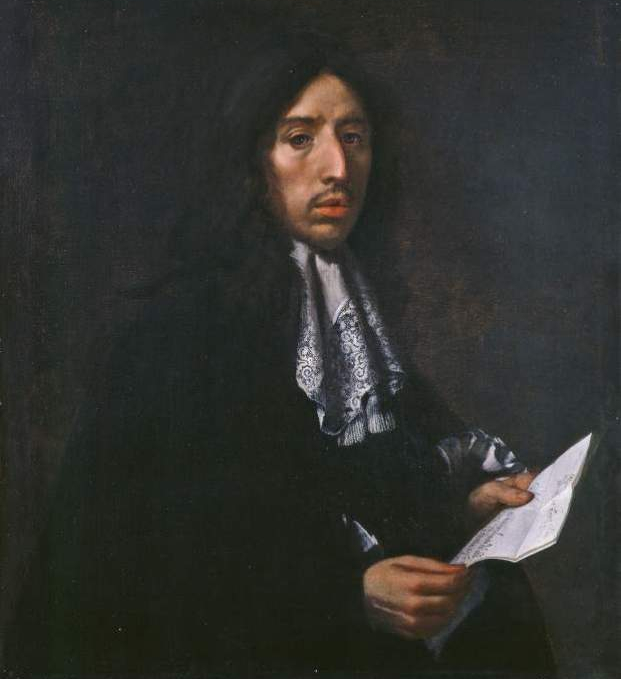
Sir John Finch, Carlo Dolci, Fitzwilliam Museum

Sir John Finch (1626–1682) was ambassador of England to the Ottoman Empire.

One of the Finches of Burley-on-the-Hill, John Finch was the younger brother of Lord Chancellor Sir Heneage Finch, 1st Earl of Nottingham; their half-sister was the philosopher Lady Anne Conway of Ragley Hall. Anne and John Finch were pupils of Henry More.

After Eton John Finch studied with More at Christ's College, Cambridge, and there met his lifelong companion Sir Thomas Baines. Following a Grand Tour of Italy, where they graduated in medicine from the University of Padua in 1656 Finch and Baines returned to Christ's as teachers in 1660, and fellows of the Royal Society.

They returned to Italy again from 1665 to 1670 when Finch was Minister to the Ducal Court at Florence. He was elected by the company on the king's education on 7 November 1672.

Sir John was ambassador to the Sublime Porte of the Ottoman Empire in Constantinople, succeeding his uncle Heneage Finch, 3rd Earl of Winchilsea and his cousin Daniel Harvey arriving on 18 March 1674. Finch was not a strong ambassador and was constantly outwitted by the Grand Viziers Ahmet Köprülü and Kara Mustafa Other British residents during Finch's tenure included the Reverend John Covel, merchant Sir Dudley North, Finch's consul in Smyrna, Paul Rycaut and their letters and memoirs contribute to our picture of Finch's tenure as the diplomat in residence. Finch and Baines are further remembered in the poem Baines His Dissection by Scottish poet, David Kinloch. He left Turkey in November 1681.

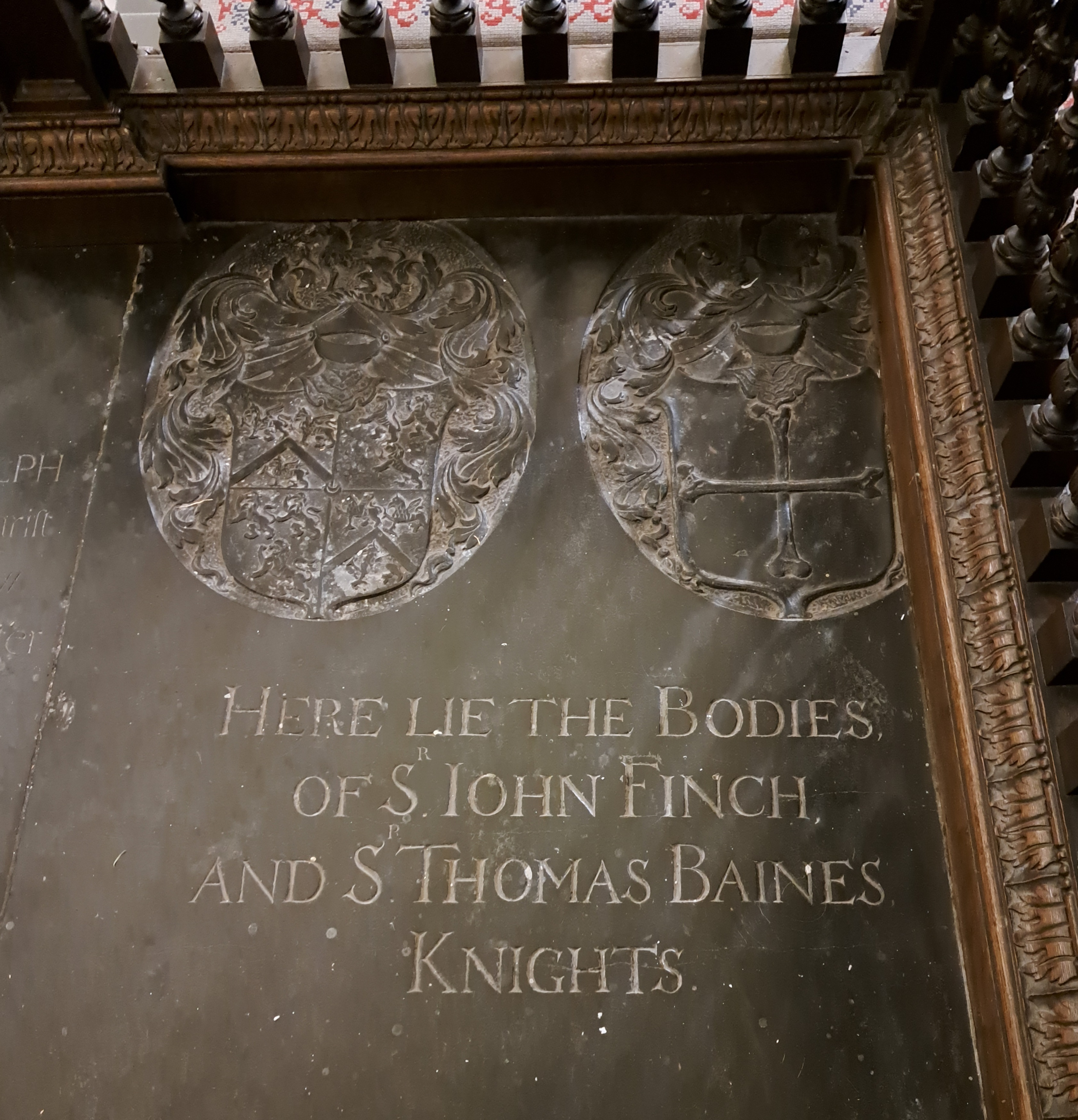
The joint grave of Sir Thomas Baines and Sir John Finch.

Sir John Finch died of pleurisy in Florence, Italy in 1682, is buried in Christ's College and commemorated with Baines, who had died in Constantinople, with an elaborate monument. Their portraits by Florentine artist Carlo Dolci hang in the Fitzwilliam Museum, Cambridge.

Diplomatic posts
Preceded by Sir Daniel Harvey	British ambassador to the Ottoman Empire; 1672-1681	Succeeded by Lord Chandos
