= David Henshaw =

David Henshaw may refer to:

- David Henshaw (American politician) (1791–1852), United States Secretary of the Navy
- David Henshaw (Australian politician) (1931–2008), member of the Victorian Legislative Council
- David Henshaw (cartoonist) (1939–2014), New Zealand cartoonist
- David Henshaw (administrator), chief executive of Liverpool City Council
