= Philip Packer =

English barrister and architect

Philip Packer FRS (24 June 1618 Groombridge, Kent – 24 December 1686) was an English barrister and architect. He was a courtier to Charles II, and friend to Christopher Wren.

== Biography ==
He was educated at University College, Oxford where he matriculated in 1635. He then took up law at the Middle Temple and was called to the bar as a barrister in 1647.

He rebuilt Groombridge Place with Wren's help in 1662. On 21 May 1669, he met with Samuel Pepys. He was an Original Fellow of the Royal Society.

== Family ==
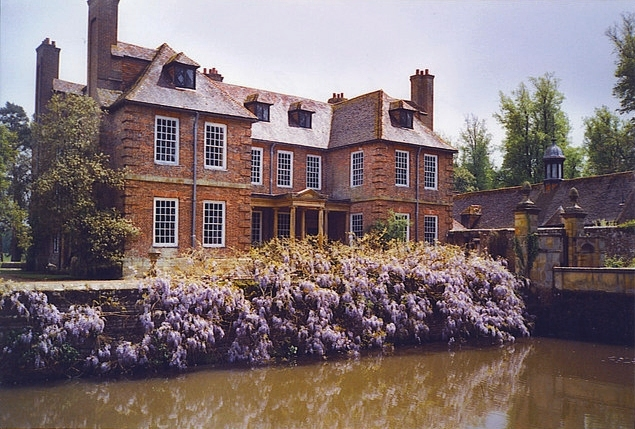
Groombridge Place

His parents were John Packer, Clerk of the Privy Seal (12 Nov 1572 – 15 Feb 1649), and Philippa Mills.

He married Isabella Berkeley in 1653 in Groombridge, Kent; they had seven children:

- Robert Packer (died aged 16)
- John Philip Packer Esq. of Groombridge (1655 Groombridge – 16 December 1697)
- Katherine Packer (1661 Groombridge, Kent, England – 30 Nov 1722 Finedon, Northampton, England)
- Isabella Packer
- Elizabeth Packer
- Temperance Packer (1663)

He married Sarah Isgar on 20 December 1666. Prior to their marriage, Philip and Sarah had three children in Ireland where Philip owned extensive properties:

- Philip Packer (19 March 1664 - 1739), who emigrated to New Jersey.
- James Packer (3 March 1657 – 12 Jul 1690) at the Battle of the Boyne, Ireland.
- William Packer (died 1690 in Battle of Boyne).
