= Thomas Baines (physician) =

English physician

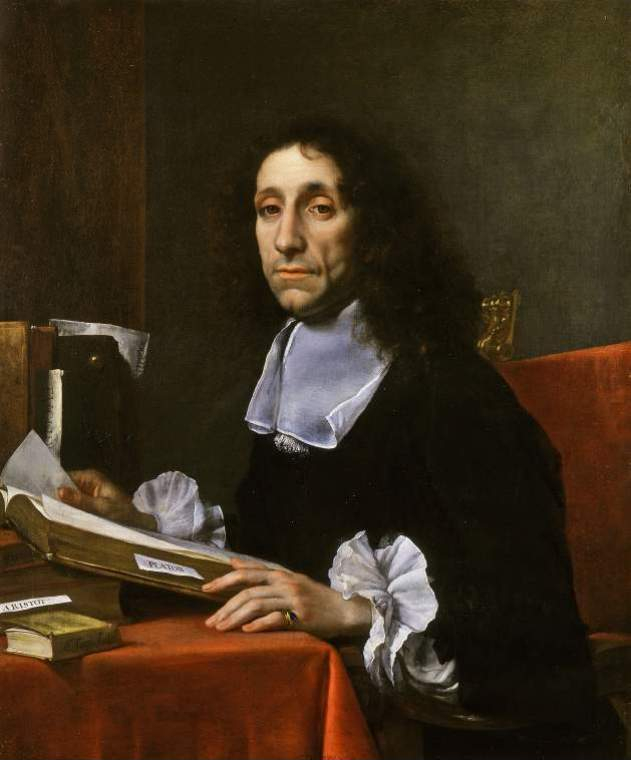
Sir Thomas Baines, Carlo Dolci, Fitzwilliam Museum

Sir Thomas Baines, M.D. (1622–1680) was an English physician and the lifelong companion of the ambassador Sir John Finch.

== Life ==
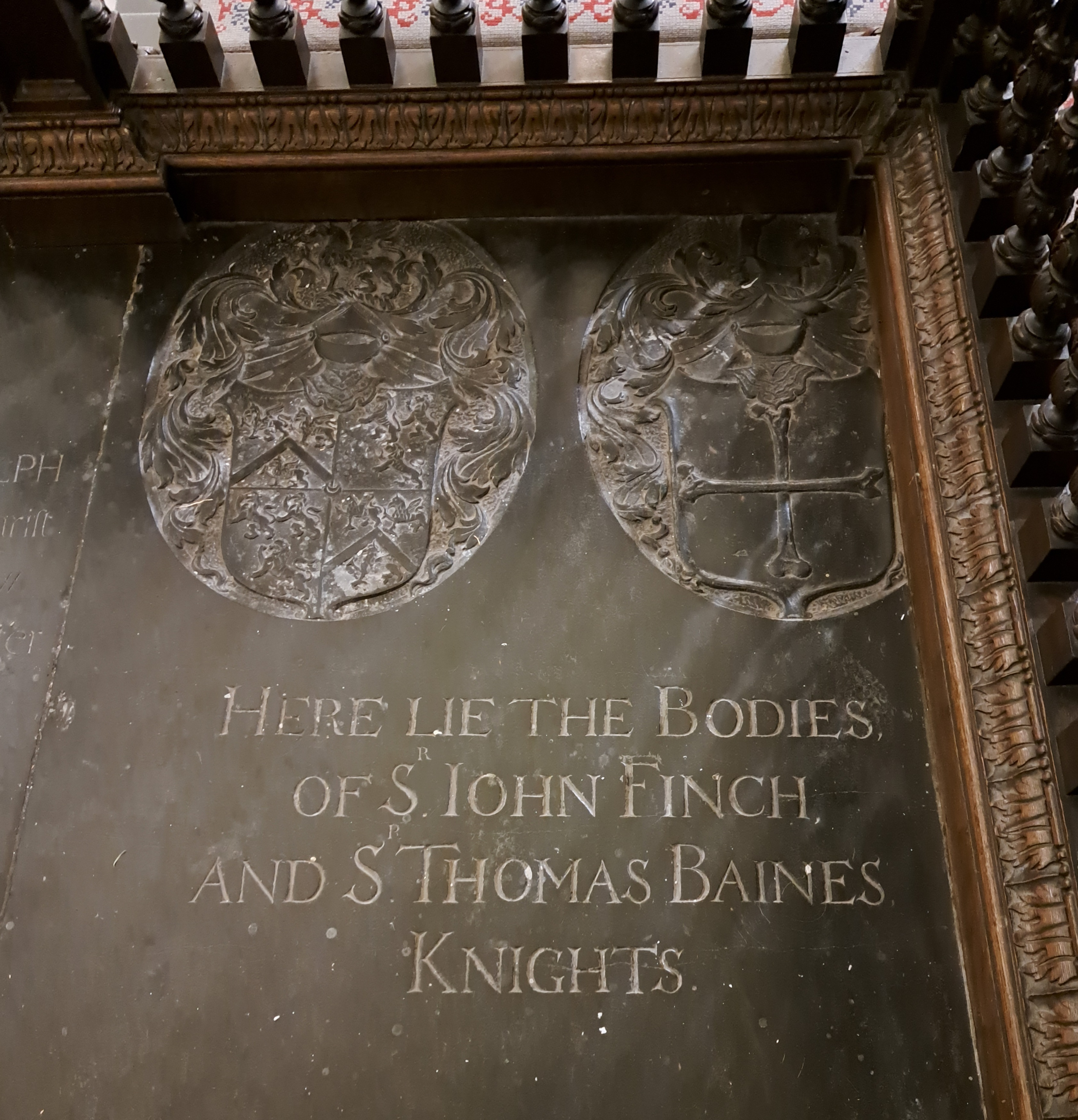
The joint grave of Sir Thomas Baines and Sir John Finch.

Baines was born about 1622 in Whaddon, Cambridgeshire and educated at Bishop's Stortford school. He studied at Christ's College, Cambridge under the tuition of Henry More, and took the degree of B.A. in 1642, and M.A. in 1649. An accident brought him under the notice of John Finch, then at the same college, and from this time they became inseparable friends. Having accompanied Finch to Italy, Baines was created doctor of physic at Padua, and he received the same degree from Cambridge on his return to England in 1660. On 8 March of the same year he was chosen Gresham Professor of Music, and in May he was elected, along with Sir John Finch, a fellow extraordinary of the College of Physicians, London. In 1663 he was elected an original Fellow of the Royal Society.

From 1664 to 1670 he was at Florence, where Finch was ambassador. On his appointment, in 1672, to accompany Sir John Finch to Tuscany, in the character of physician, he received the honour of knighthood. Some years afterwards he was transferred, along with Finch, to Constantinople. He made arrangements for discharging his professorial duties by deputy, but, on account of his prolonged absence, he was deprived of the chair before the news of his death, at Constantinople on 5 September 1680, had reached England. Finch was distraught at Baines' death, and wrote that it 'cut off the thread of all my worldly happiness'. He described their relationship as a "sweet and unbroken marriage of souls, and a fellowship undivided for thirty-six entire years", and "sacred to an unspeakable love".

Portraits of Baines and Finch by the Florentine artist Carlo Dolci hang in the Fitzwilliam Museum, Cambridge. The pair are further remembered in the poem Baines His Dissection by Scottish poet, David Kinloch.
