= William Erskine (master of Charterhouse) =

William Erskine (died 1685), was master of Charterhouse Hospital.

== Biography ==
Erskine was the seventh son of John Erskine, Earl of Mar, by his second wife, Lady Mary Stewart, daughter of Esme Stewart, Duke of Lennox. In 1677, on the death of Martin Clifford, he was elected master of Charterhouse, which office he held until his death on 29 May 1685.

He was a member of the Royal Society, and his name appears in the list of the first council named in the royal charter, under date 22 April 1663, but he took no active part in the scientific proceedings of the society. He also held the appointment of cupbearer to Charles II.
