= Christopher Terne =

English physician

Christopher Terne M.D. (also Tearne) (1620–1673) was an English physician.

== Life ==
He was born in Cambridgeshire, entered the University of Leyden on 22 July 1647, and there graduated M.D. In May 1650 he was incorporated first at Cambridge and then at Oxford. He was examined as a candidate at the College of Physicians on 10 May 1650, and was elected a fellow on 15 November 1655. He was elected assistant physician to St. Bartholomew's Hospital on 13 May 1653 and held office until 1669.

He was appointed lecturer on anatomy to the Barber-Surgeons' Company in 1656, and in 1663 Samuel Pepys heard him lecture. He delivered the Harveian oration at the College of Physicians, in which, as in his lectures, he speaks reverently of William Harvey. He was one of the original Fellows of the Royal Society.

Terne died at his house in Lime Street, London, on 1 December 1673, and was buried in St. Andrew's Undershaft. His library was sold on 12 April 1686 with that of Dr. Thomas Allen.

== Works ==
The only writings of Terne that were printed were some Latin verses on Christopher Bennet which are placed below his portrait in the Theatrum Tabidorum. The Harveian oration exists in manuscript (Sloane MS. 1903). His 'Prælectio Prima ad Chirurgos' and other lectures were preserved in the Sloane Collection in the British Museum. The lectures, which are dated 1656, begin with an account of the skin, going on to the deeper parts, and were delivered contemporaneously with the dissection of a body on the table. Several volumes of notes of his medical reading are preserved in the same collection, and an essay entitled 'An respiratio inserviat nutritioni?'

== Family ==
He married Susan, daughter of Henry Borne. His daughter Henrietta married Dr. Edward Browne.
