= Nicasius le Febure =

French chemist and alchemist (1615–1669)

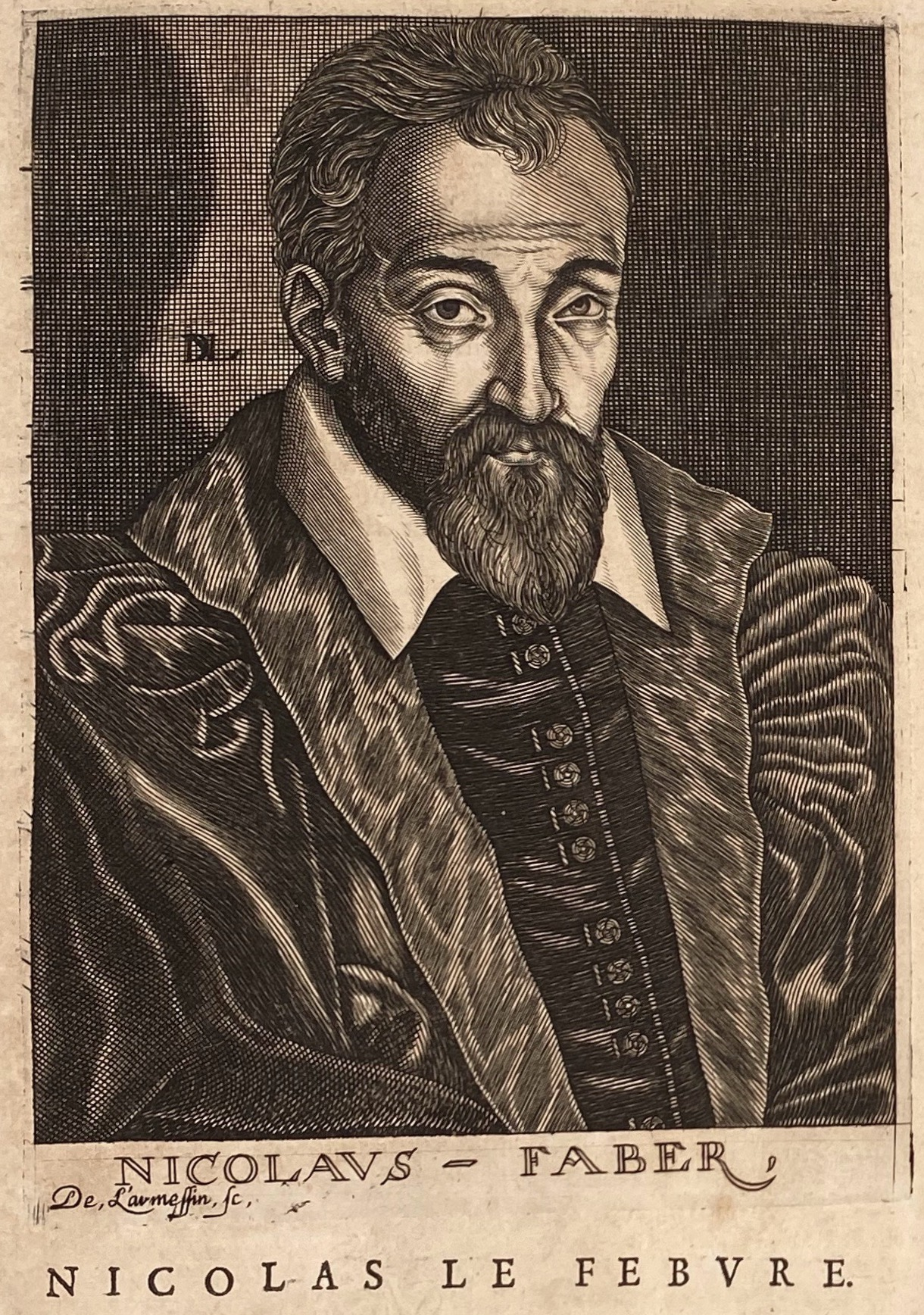
Nicasius le Febure

Nicasius le Febure, a.k.a. Nicolas le Febure or Nicasius le Fevre or Nicolas le Fèvre (1615 – 1669), was a French chemist and alchemist who was appointed to positions by both French and English royalty.

== Early life ==
Le Febure was born and educated in Sedan, Principality of Sedan, going to the Academy there.

== Work ==
Vallot, first physician to Louis XIV, appointed him demonstrator of chemistry at the Jardin du Roi, Paris; Diarist John Evelyn is recorded as having attended a course of his lectures there in February 1647. In 1660 he was appointed Professor of Chemistry to Charles II of England in 1660, Apothecary in Ordinary to the Royal Family in 1660 and Manager of the laboratory at St James's Palace, London.

== Personal life ==
It is believed he became a naturalised English citizen in 1662. He was elected a Fellow of the Royal Society (FRS) on 20 May 1663.

== Death ==
Febure died in the Parish of St. Martin-in-the-Fields, London, in the spring of 1669. There exists an engraved portrait of him.

== Works ==
Le Fevre was an able chemist and a lucid, learned, and accurate author. He wrote:

- Traité de la Chymie: A Compendious Body of Chymistry: Wherein is contained whatsoever is necessary for the attaining to the curious knowledge of this Art; Comprehending in general the whole practice thereof: and teaching the most exact preparation of Animals, Vegetables and Minerals, so as to preserve their essential Vertues. Laid open in two Books, and dedicated to the use of all Apothecaries, &c. (2 volumes, 1664 - English translation).
- Disputatio de Myrrhata Potione (in volume ix. of John Pearson's Critici Sacri (1660).
- A Discourse upon Sr. Walter Rawleigh’s Great Cordial (1664).
