= David Kinloch =

Scottish physician and poet (1560–1617)

David Kinloch (1560–1617) was a Scottish physician and poet.

Kinloch was imprisoned by the Spanish Inquisition.

In Scotland, Kinloch was appointed a physician to the king on 20 March 1596-7. James VI signed a lengthy Latin testimonial referring to Kinloch's kinship to Ramsay and Lindsay of Edzell families. Below the document are illustrated the arms of his four grandparents: Kinloch, Ramsay, Lindsay, and Hay.

Kinloch married Grizzel Hay, the heiress of the lands of Gourdie. He owned the estate of Aberbothrie in Alyth.

His portrait, dated 1614, is displayed at Ninewells Hospital, Dundee.

Kinloch published a medical treatise in Latin verse, De hominis procreatione, anatome, ac morbis internis (Paris, 1596).
