= Walter Pope =

English astronomer and poet

Walter Pope (c. 1627 – 1714) was an English astronomer and poet. He was the son of Francis Pope and Jane Dod, daughter of the Puritan minister John Dod. He was born in Northamptonshire and was the half brother of John Wilkins, who would become bishop of Chester and one of the founders of the Royal Society. He was educated at Wadham College, Oxford, with a BA in 1649, MA in 1651. Until the Restoration, he worked in Wadham College.

In 1660, he became the professor of astronomy at Gresham College in London, taking over for Sir Christopher Wren, and he was also appointed Dean of Wadham College. He became one of the earliest members of the Royal Society, and he was also made the registrar of the diocese of Chester. During the 1660s, he was active in the Royal Society, with two letters published in Philosophical Transactions in 1665 and 1666. He traveled to France and Italy and reported for the Royal Society from Italy.

In 1686, he developed a severe eye infection, and he resigned his teaching post in 1687. In 1693, his collection of books burned. Anthony à Wood wrote of Pope as a libertine, and he published collections of poetry and translations in 1698, but others regarded him as pious and devout. He died in 1714 and left his money and belongings to a woman named Anne Shargold, who had cared for him in his illness. He was buried in St. Giles, Cripplegate.
