= Thomas Nott =

English royalist army officer

Sir Thomas Nott

Sir Thomas Nott (11 December 1606 – 1681) was an English royalist army officer and an original fellow of the Royal Society. In 1640, he acquired the remainder of the crown lease of Twickenham Park, Middlesex which he sold in 1659.

Nott was the eldest son of Roger Nott of London, and attended Merchant Taylors' School, London and Pembroke College, Cambridge. He married in 1637 and later that year bought the manors of Sagebury and Obden in Dodderhill, Worcestershire.

Nott served Charles I during the First Civil War. As Lieutenant-Colonel Nott, he was mistakenly reported killed by the New Model Army during the capture of Highworth, Wiltshire, in June 1645.

He was one of the Gentleman Ushers in Ordinary of the Honourable Privy Chamber to Charles II. The coat of arms he bore were the Azure a bend or between three lions' faces.
