= David Bruce (physician) =

Scottish physician

David Bruce (fl. 1660), was a Scottish physician.

Bruce was the son of Andrew Bruce, D.D., principal (from 1630 to 1647) of St. Leonard's College in St. Andrew's University. He was first educated at St. Andrews, and proceeded M.A. there. Later he went to France, and studied physic at Paris and Montpellier. He intended taking a medical degree at Padua; but the plague kept him from Italy, and he finally graduated M.D. at Valence in Dauphiny on 7 May 1657. On 27 March 1660 Bruce was incorporated doctor of physic at Oxford. He was associated with his great-uncle, Sir John Wedderburne, in the office of physician to the Duke and Duchess of York. But after fulfilling, in consequence of Wedderburne's infirmities, all the duties of the post for many years, he resigned the office and travelled abroad. Subsequently, he settled at Edinburgh, and was there 'in good repute for his practice.' Wood speaks of him as still living in Edinburgh in 1690. Bruce was admitted candidate of the College of Physicians on 24 December 1660, and was an original member of the Royal Society.
