= Daniel Colwall =

English merchant and philanthropist

Daniel Colwall (died 1690) was an English merchant and philanthropist.

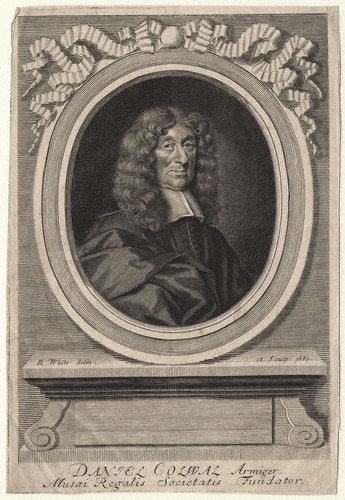
Daniel Colwall, 1681 engraving by Robert White.

== Life ==
Colwall became one of the original Fellows of the Royal Society on 20 May 1663 and was elected to its council in the following November. He served as the Society's treasurer for from 1665 to 1679. In 1663 and 1666, he presented the society with £50, while continuing his weekly payments. He died in the Liberty of the Tower of London in November 1690.

== Legacy ==
With Colwall's money, the collection of "rarities formerly belonging to Mr. Hubbard" was acquired in 1666, and kept in Gresham College, a first step towards the formation of a museum. The preparation of the catalogue was entrusted to Dr. Nehemiah Grew, who published it in 1681 with the title Musæum Regalis Societatis. This book is embellished with 31 plates, many of which, if not all, were engraved at Colwall's expense.

He had long been a governor of Christ's Hospital, to which in his lifetime he was a liberal benefactor. In his will, dated 12 August, with codicil dated 19 August, proved on 20 November 1690, he bequeathed to the school 'for ever one rent or yearly payment of sixty-two pounds and eight shillings issuing and payable out of the hereditary excise which was assigned to me by Sir Robert Viner, knt. and bart., deceased,' and the sum of £4,000.

== Others of this name ==
James Granger, followed by Owen Manning and William Bray, and Edward Wedlake Brayley and John Britton confused Colwall with his great-nephew of the same name, of the Friary, near Guildford, and the son of Arnold Colwall.
