= Henry Slingsby (Master of the Mint) =

English Master of the Mint

Sir Henry Slingsby (c.1621 – c.1688) was an English Master of the Mint.

He was the third son of Sir William Slingsby of Kippax, West Yorkshire and was educated at Exeter College, Oxford.

He was appointed Deputy Master of the Mint (based in the Tower of London) to Sir Ralph Freeman from 1662 to 1667 and sole Master from 1667 to 1680. Slingsby introduced the idea of stamping the inscription "Decus et Tutamen" around the edge of silver coins to prevent clipping. He built a new house at Park Wood, Burrough Green.

The position of Master was normally held for life, but in 1680 Slingsby was suspended from office on the grounds of incompetence. His financial accounts were so faulty that he was suspected of fraud and his property temporarily seized to make good the losses. The duties of Master were then executed by a commission pending Slingsby's resignation in 1686. He died a debtor around 1690.

Elected an Original Fellow of the Royal Society in 1663, he was expelled from the Society in 1675 for non-payment of dues.

He had married Ann Cave, with whom he had sons Anthony and Henry.
