= Nathaniel Henshaw =

English physician

Nathaniel Henshaw M.D. (baptised 1628 – 1673) was an English physician and original Fellow of the Royal Society.

== Life ==
He was a younger son of Benjamin Henshaw (died 4 December 1631) and his wife Anne, daughter of William Bonham of London; Thomas Henshaw was his elder brother. He first studied medicine at the University of Padua in 1649. He was entered for the physic course at Leyden University on 4 November 1653, proceeded M.D. there, and was admitted M.D. ad eundem at Trinity College, Dublin in the summer term 1664.

On 20 May 1663 Henshaw was elected Fellow of the Royal Society. He practised in Dublin as a physician, but died in London in September 1673, and was buried on 13 September in Kensington Church. His will, dated 6 August 1673, was proved at London on the following 11 September by his sister, Anne Grevys.

== Works ==
Henshaw was author of a treatise Aero-Chalinos (1664) concerned with "fresh air" and its medical value, and a preliminary introduction of the concept of hyperbaric medicine. A second edition (London, 1677) was printed by order of the Royal Society, at a meeting held on 1 March 1677, having been prepared for the press by Thomas Henshaw. It was reviewed in Philosophical Transactions (xii. 834–5) by Henry Oldenburg.

Papers written by Henshaw on saltpetre and gunpowder were strongly attacked by Henry Stubbe.

== Notes ==
Attribution

This article incorporates text from a publication now in the public domain: Stephen, Leslie; Lee, Sidney, eds. (1891). "Henshaw, Nathaniel". Dictionary of National Biography. Vol. 26. London: Smith, Elder & Co.
