= Edward Cotton (priest, died 1675) =

English priest

Monument to Edward Cotton in Exeter Cathedral

Edward Cotton (2 November 1616 - 11 November 1675) was the Archdeacon of Cornwall from 1660 until his death.

Sleech was from Silverton, Devon and educated at Christ Church, Oxford. He was appointed Rector of St. Thomas and St. Peter, Winchester in 1640; a Canon of Exeter in 1660; Vicar of Bampton in 1663 and Treasurer of Exeter in 1672.
