= Thomas Henshaw (alchemist) =

English lawyer, courtier, diplomat and scientific writer

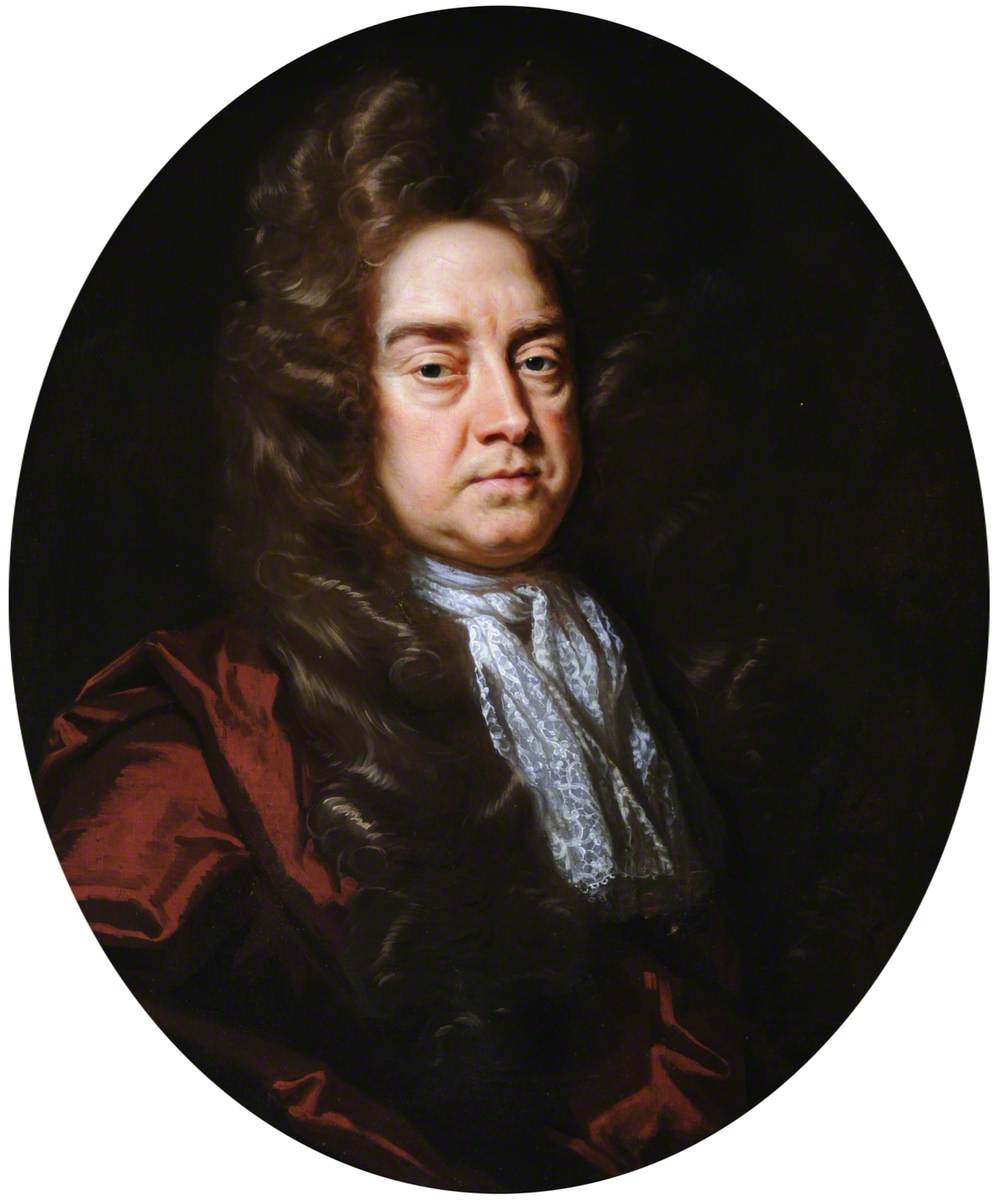
A portrait of Henshaw by John Closterman

Thomas Henshaw (1618–1700) was an English lawyer, courtier, diplomat and scientific writer. While not a published alchemist, he was a significant figure in English alchemical work from the 1650s onwards; he is known to have used the pen-name "Halophilus".

== Early life ==
The son of Benjamin Henshaw and his wife Anne, and brother to Nathaniel Henshaw. he was baptised at St. Mary Magdalen, Milk Street, City of London, on 15 June 1618. After attending school at Barnet and then at Cripplegate, London, under Thomas Farnaby, he was entered as commoner at University College, Oxford, in 1634, and remained there five years without taking a degree. At the suggestion of Obadiah Walker and Abraham Woodhead, he studied mathematics, a student of William Oughtred at Albury, Surrey for nine months from 1636, finding it more stimulating than the teaching of his tutor John Elmherst. He also knew the Rosicrucian scholar William Backhouse, who was another of Oughtred's pupils.

Henshaw entered the Middle Temple, and in 1637 became tutor there to John Evelyn, to become a lifelong friend, and his brothers. On the outbreak of the First English Civil War he joined Charles I at York. Soon afterwards he went to London, and was taken prisoner by the Parliamentarians.

== Continental travel ==
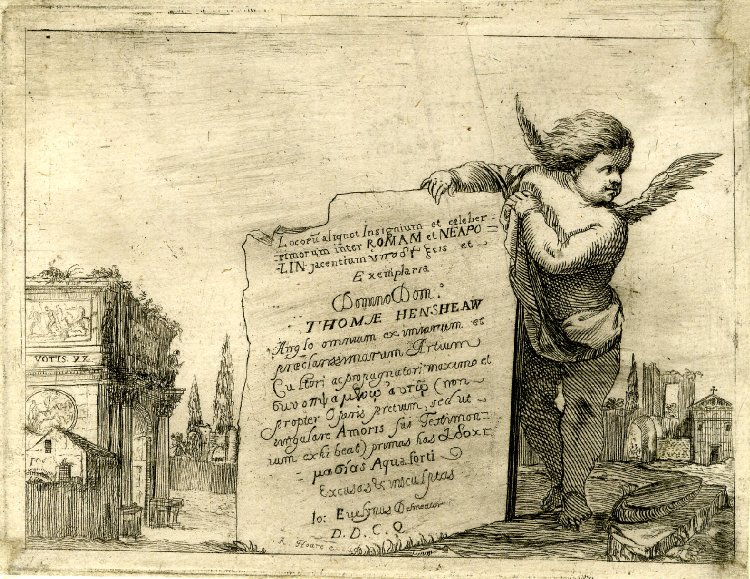
Etching by John Evelyn, dedicated to Henshaw, from their Italian travels.

Henshaw was allowed to leave England, on giving security not to join the king's army again, and sailed to Holland. He took part in a campaign under William II, Prince of Orange; and then entered the French army, in which he became major, and at some point served under Sir Robert Moray. He subsequently travelled through Spain, and on to Italy, where he lived at Rome, Venice and Padua. He spent a period from late 1644 as the travelling companion of John Evelyn, whom he had encountered at Pisa. They visited Athanasius Kircher's showy rooms in Rome together. When Evelyn moved on to Venice, Henshaw spent time accompanying the young Henry Howard. Evelyn, Henshaw and Francis Bramston were then together at Padua for a period.

At the end of the 1640s Henshaw left to return to England. He left Paris, where he had been staying, and came back in 1650; or earlier, before the king's execution in January 1649. During his time in Paris, Henshaw purchased and annotated a copy of La Vie Devote, currently owned by the University of Kentucky Libraries.

== Under the Commonwealth ==
On his return to England Henshaw kept a low profile into the 1650s, living a studious life in Kensington, then outside London. A "chemical club" in which he was involved was set up in 1650 by Robert Child: other members were Thomas Vaughan and William Webbe. In alchemy he collaborated with Vaughan, who resided with him in Kensington, and Samuel Hartlib reported Henshaw's claims to have found the alkahest, with a formula of provenance from Jan Baptist van Helmont, via Hugh Plat. Henshaw is referred to in the preface to Elias Ashmole's Way to Bliss (1658) as an expert in the occult science of the time; Ashmole's Theatrum Chemicum Britannicum (1652) had made good use of Henshaw's library.

Hartlib noted Henshaw's plans for a college, one of a number of proposals of the time entertained also by Evelyn and his friend Abraham Cowley. Henshaw was occupying the Pondhouse or Moathouse, in the manor of West Town, Kensington, a property that had been leased by his father. There for a period in the early 1650s a utopian "Christian Learned Society" existed; there was a group of eight, with Henshaw, Vaughan and six others. Across the political divide of the time, Henshaw kept in touch with Hartlib, and the title of the Society chimed exactly with the ideas of the Hartlib Circle, and in particular John Hall. The house itself was mostly demolished around 1800.

Henshaw was called to the bar, in 1654, but dropped the practice of the common law. He sold his accommodation in the Middle Temple to Ashmole, in 1658. At about this time, according to one account, he attended meetings at Gresham College of the "Oxonian Society" for virtuosi and natural philosophers.

== Later life ==
Henshaw was one of the council that succeeded the 1660 committee of 12, and that actually set up the Royal Society. He was chosen a Fellow of the Royal Society at its first constitution in 1663, and was an officer of the Society over many years. He continued alchemical researches, with Sir Robert Paston. When the Society was in the doldrums in the 1670s, he was one of the group meeting with Robert Hooke to promote its activity. In 1688 he borrowed a work by Franciscus Mercurius van Helmont from Francis Lodwick, another of the "Hooke circle" that functioned also as a book club.

In 1672 Henshaw attended Charles Stewart, 3rd Duke of Richmond, ambassador extraordinary to the court of Denmark, as secretary of the embassy and assistant to the duke. The latter died on 12 December of the same year, and Henshaw was commanded to remain in Denmark as envoy extraordinary, and held the office for two years and a half. He was appointed Charles II's under-secretary of the French tongue and gentleman of the privy council in ordinary; the appointment, gained with Evelyn's help, was during the 1670s. He continued as French secretary under James II and William III (inscription on his tombstone).

Henshaw spent the last years of his life at his house in Kensington, where he died on 2 January 1700.

== Works ==
Henshaw published, from the Italian of Álvaro Semedo, History of the Great and Renowned Monarchy of China, to which is added a History of the late Invasion and Conquest of the flourishing Kingdom of the Tartars, with an exact account of the other Affairs of China, London, 1655. After the Restoration minor papers appeared by him in the Philosophical Transactions of the Royal Society, and two short treatises on making Salt Peter and Gunpowder. He edited with an epistle to the reader Stephen Skinner's Etymologicon Linguæ Anglicanæ, 1671.

In 1654 there was printed at Spa a Vindication of Thomas Henshaw, sometime Major in the French King's service, in justification of himself against the Aspersions throwne upon him. In this he repudiates any share in plots on behalf of Charles II, but calls Oliver Cromwell "the greatest murtherer". This, however, was by a cousin of the same name.

== Family ==
According to his tombstone in the chancel of the parish church of Kensington, Henshaw married Anne Kipping, daughter of Robert Kipping of Tudeley, Kent; they had six sons and two daughters. His wife died 4 October 1671. A daughter Anne, his sole survivor, married Thomas Halsey of Gaddesden, Hertfordshire.

== Notes ==
Attribution

This article incorporates text from a publication now in the public domain: Stephen, Leslie; Lee, Sidney, eds. (1891). "Henshaw, Thomas". Dictionary of National Biography. Vol. 26. London: Smith, Elder & Co.
