= Peter Pett (lawyer) =

English lawyer and author

Sir Peter Pett MP

Member of Parliament for Askeaton
- In office 1661–1666

Personal details
- Born: October 1630 Deptford
- Died: 1 April 1699 (aged 68)
- Education: Sidney Sussex College, Cambridge; Pembroke College, Oxford; All Souls College, Oxford
- Occupation: Lawyer, Parliamentarian

Sir Peter Pett (October 1630 – 1 April 1699) was an English lawyer and writer.

== Life ==
Peter Pett, son of Peter Pett (1593 – 1652), master-shipwright at Deptford, grandson of Peter Pett of Wapping, shipbuilder, and great-grandson of Peter Pett (died 1589), was baptised in St. Nicholas Church, Deptford, on 31 October 1630. He was educated in St. Paul's School and at Sidney-Sussex College, Cambridge, where he was admitted in 1645. After graduating BA he migrated to Pembroke College, Oxford, and in 1648 was elected to a fellowship at All Souls'. He then graduated BCL in 1650, was entered as a student at Gray's Inn, and settled there "for good and all" about a year before the Restoration. From 1661 to 1666 he sat in the Irish Parliament as MP for Askeaton. He was called to the bar from the Middle Temple in 1664. When the Royal Society was formed, in 1663, Pett was one of the original fellows, elected on 20 May, but was expelled on 18 November 1675 for "not performing his obligation to the society". He was probably absorbed in other interests. He had been appointed Advocate-General for Ireland, where he was knighted by the Duke of Ormonde.

Pett died on 1 April 1699. He has been often confused with his father's first cousin, Peter, Commissioner of the Navy at Chatham.

== Works ==
He was also much engaged in literary work, more or less of a polemical nature. A short tract, headed Sir Peter Pett's Paper, 1679, about the Papists, is in the Public Record Office. His published works are:

1. A Discourse concerning Liberty of Conscience, London, 1661, 8vo.
2. The Happy future Estate of England, 1680, fol.; republished in 1689 as A Discourse of the Growth of England in Populousness and Trade … By way of a Letter to a Person of Honour.
3. The obligation resulting from the Oath of Supremacy …, 1687, fol.

He edited also the Memoirs of Arthur [Annesley], Earl of Anglesey, 1693, 8vo, and The genuine Remains of Dr. Thomas Barlow, late Lord Bishop of Lincoln, 1693, 8vo.

== Sources ==
- Knight's Life of Colet, p. 407;
- Foster's Alumni Oxonienses;
- Wood's Athenæ, iv. 576;
- St. Paul's School Registers, p. 43;
- Burrows's Worthies of All Souls', pp. 476, 540.

== See also ==
- Pett dynasty

== Bibliography ==
- Laughton, John Knox (1896). "Pett, Peter (1630-1699)" . In Lee, Sidney (ed.). Dictionary of National Biography. Vol. 45. London: Smith, Elder & Co. p. 105.
- Laughton, J. K.; Kelsey, Sean (2004). "Pett, Sir Peter (bap. 1630, d. 1699)". In Oxford Dictionary of National Biography. Oxford: Oxford University Press. n.p.
