= Diving cylinder =

Container to supply high pressure gas for diving operations

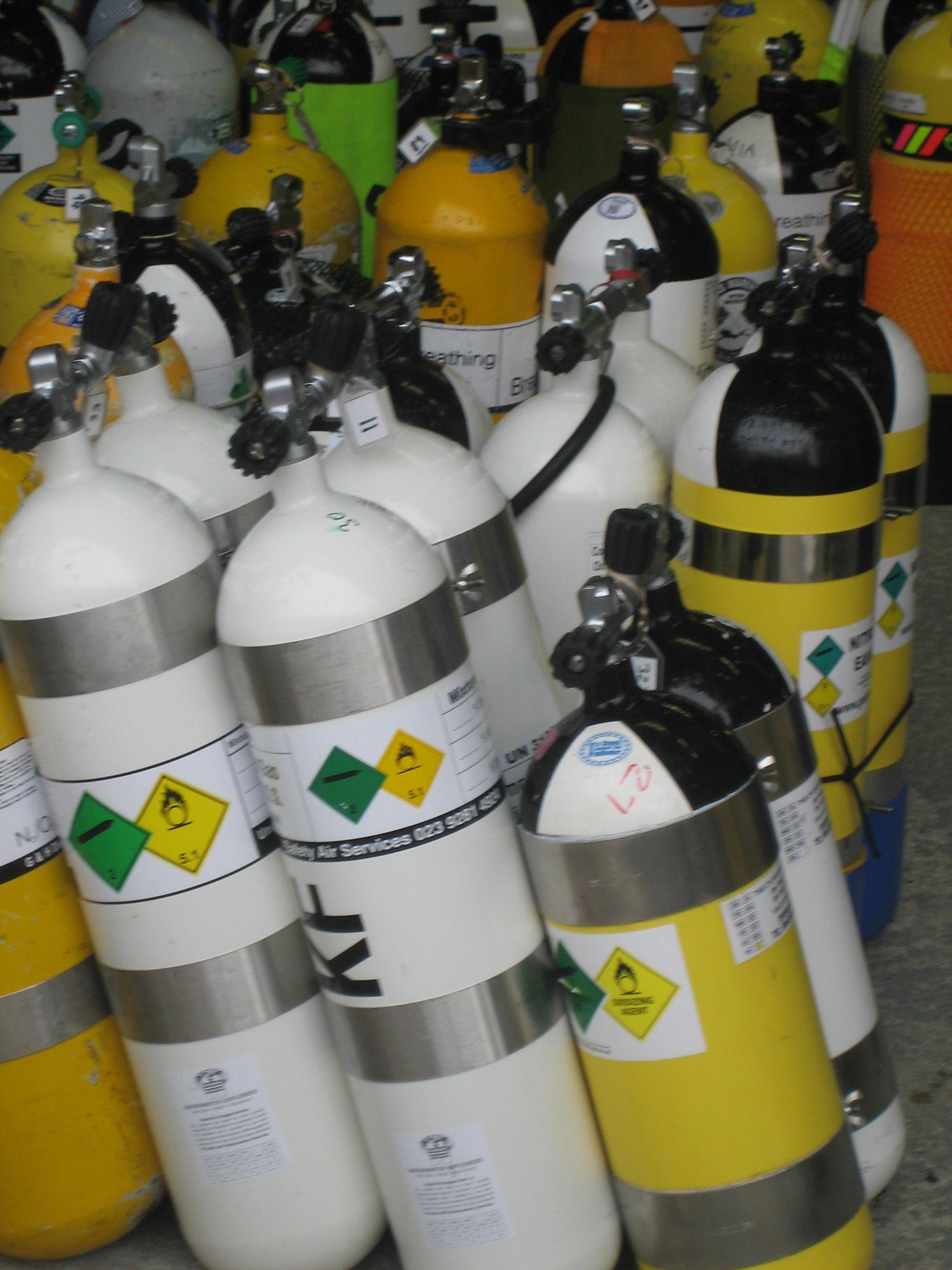
- Diving cylinders to be filled at a diving air compressor station
- Other names: Scuba tank
- Uses: Breathing gas supply for scuba or surface-supplied divers

A diving cylinder or diving gas cylinder is a gas cylinder used to store and transport high-pressure gas used in diving operations. This may be breathing gas used with a scuba set, in which case the cylinder may also be referred to as a scuba cylinder, scuba tank or diving tank. When used for an emergency gas supply for surface-supplied diving or scuba, it may be referred to as a bailout cylinder or bailout bottle. It may also be used for surface-supplied diving or as decompression gas. A diving cylinder may also be used to supply inflation gas for a dry suit, buoyancy compensator, decompression buoy, or lifting bag. Cylinders provide breathing gas to the diver by free-flow or through the demand valve of a diving regulator, or via the breathing loop of a diving rebreather.

Diving cylinders are usually manufactured from aluminum or steel alloys, and when used on a scuba set are normally fitted with one of two common types of scuba cylinder valve for filling and connection to the regulator. Other accessories such as manifolds, cylinder bands, protective nets and boots and carrying handles may be provided. Various configurations of harness may be used by the diver to carry a cylinder or cylinders while diving, depending on the application. Cylinders used for scuba typically have an internal volume (known as water capacity) of between 3 and 18 litres (0.11 and 0.64 ft^{3}) and a maximum working pressure rating from 184 to 300 bars (2,670 to 4,350 psi). Cylinders are also available in smaller sizes, such as 0.5, 1.5 and 2 litres; however these are usually used for purposes such as inflation of surface marker buoys, dry suits, and buoyancy compensators rather than breathing. Scuba divers may dive with a single cylinder, a pair of similar cylinders, or a main cylinder and a smaller "pony" cylinder, carried on the diver's back or clipped onto the harness at the side. Paired cylinders may be manifolded together or independent. In technical diving, more than two scuba cylinders may be needed to carry different gases. Larger cylinders, typically up to 50 litre capacity, are used as on-board emergency gas supply on diving bells. Large cylinders are also used for surface supply through a diver's umbilical, and may be manifolded together on a frame for transportation.

The selection of an appropriate set of scuba cylinders for a diving operation is based on the estimated amount of gas required to safely complete the dive. Diving cylinders are most commonly filled with air, but because the main components of air can cause problems when breathed underwater at higher ambient pressure, divers may choose to breathe from cylinders filled with mixtures of gases other than air. Many jurisdictions have regulations that govern the filling, recording of contents, and labeling for diving cylinders. Periodic testing and inspection of diving cylinders is often obligatory to ensure the safety of operators of filling stations. Pressurized diving cylinders are considered dangerous goods for commercial transportation, and regional and international standards for colouring and labeling may also apply.

== Terminology ==
A "diving gas cylinder" can refer to any gas cylinder containing a diving gas. The terms "diving cylinder" or "scuba cylinder" tend to be used by gas equipment engineers, manufacturers, support professionals, and divers speaking British English. "Scuba tank" or "diving tank" is more often used colloquially by non-professionals and native speakers of American English. The term "oxygen tank" is commonly used by non-divers; however, this is usually a misnomer since these cylinders typically contain compressed atmospheric breathing air, or an oxygen-enriched air mixture. They rarely contain pure oxygen, except when used for closed circuit rebreather diving, shallow decompression stops in technical diving or for in-water oxygen recompression therapy. Breathing pure oxygen at depths greater than 6 metres (20 ft) can result in oxygen toxicity.

Diving cylinders have also been referred to as bottles or flasks, usually preceded with the word scuba, diving, air, or bailout. Scuba cylinders may also be called aqualungs, a genericized trademark derived from the Aqua-lung equipment made by the Aqua Lung/La Spirotechnique company, although that is more properly applied to an open circuit scuba set or open circuit diving regulator.

Diving cylinders may also be specified by their application, as in bailout cylinders, stage cylinders, decocompression (deco) cylinders, sidemount cylinders, pony cylinders, suit inflation cylinders, etc. The same cylinder, rigged in the same way, may be used as a bailout cylinder, a decompression cylinder or a stage cylinder.

== Parts ==
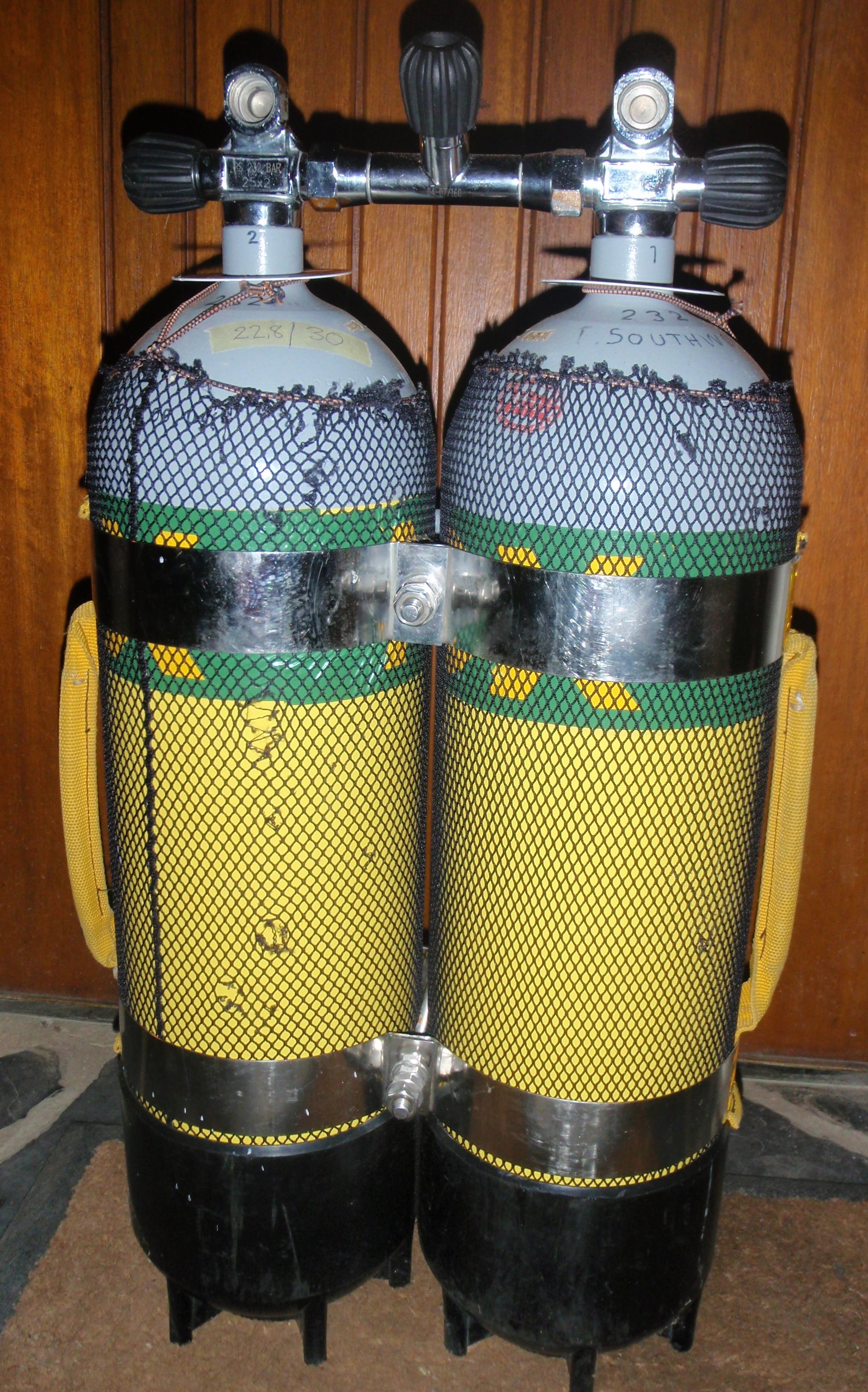
Twin 12-litre steel cylinder set

The functional diving cylinder consists of a pressure vessel and a cylinder valve. There are usually one or more optional accessories depending on the specific application.

=== The pressure vessel ===
The pressure vessel is a seamless cylinder normally made of cold-extruded aluminum or forged steel. The pressure vessel comprises a cylindrical section of even wall thickness, with a thicker base at one end, and domed shoulder with a central neck to attach a cylinder valve or manifold at the other end. Filament wound composite cylinders are used in fire fighting breathing apparatus and oxygen first aid equipment because of their low weight, but are rarely used for diving, due to their high positive buoyancy. They are occasionally used when portability for accessing the dive site is critical, such as in cave diving. Composite cylinders certified to ISO-11119-2 or ISO-11119-3 may only be used for underwater applications if they are manufactured in accordance with the requirements for underwater use and are marked "UW".

Occasionally other materials may be used. Inconel has been used for non-magnetic and highly corrosion resistant oxygen compatible spherical high-pressure gas containers for the US Navy's Mk-15 and Mk-16 mixed gas rebreathers, and a few other military rebreathers.

==== Aluminium ====
Aluminium cylinders are popular as rental equipment at tropical dive resorts as they require less maintenance. They are also often used where divers carry several cylinders, such as in technical diving in water which is warm enough that the dive suit does not provide much buoyancy, because the greater buoyancy of aluminum cylinders reduces the amount of extra buoyancy the diver would need to achieve neutral buoyancy. They may also be preferred when carried as "side mount" or "sling" cylinders as the near neutral buoyancy allows them to hang comfortably along the sides of the diver's body, without disturbing trim, and they can be handed off to another diver or stage dropped with a minimal effect on buoyancy. When in use, the cylinder valve and regulator add mass to the top of the cylinder, so the base tends to be relatively buoyant, and aluminum drop-cylinders tend to rest on the bottom in an inverted position (with the base up) if near neutral buoyancy. For the same reason they tend to hang at an angle with the base up when carried as sling cylinders unless constrained or ballasted.

Aluminum cylinders are usually manufactured by cold extrusion of aluminum billets in a process which first presses the walls and base, then trims the top edge of the cylinder walls, followed by press forming the shoulder and neck. The final structural process is machining the neck outer surface, boring, and cutting the neck threads and O-ring groove. The cylinder is then heat-treated, tested and stamped with the required gas cylinder permanent markings.

Although some aluminium cylinders were manufactured with domed bottoms, most have flat bases, allowing them to stand upright on a level surface. The flat bottoms are relatively thick to allow for rough treatment and wear, which makes them heavier than they need to be for strength, but the extra weight at the base reduces excess buoyancy and keeps the centre of gravity lower, which gives better balance in the water.

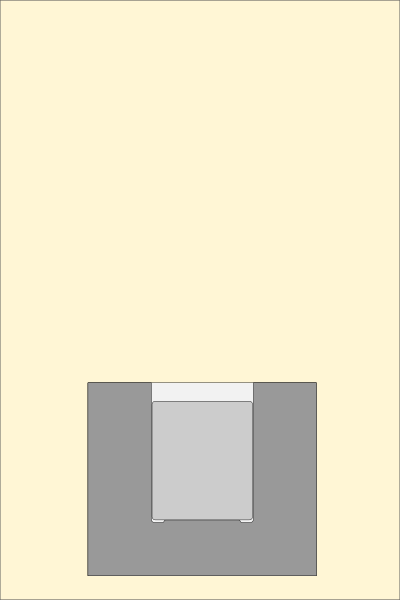
Section of die with billet inserted

Cold extrusion process

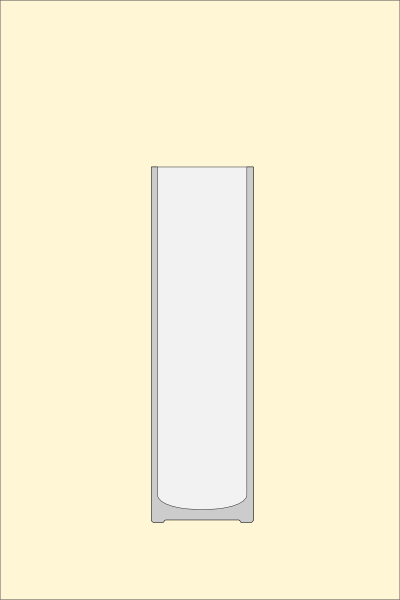
Extrusion product before trimming

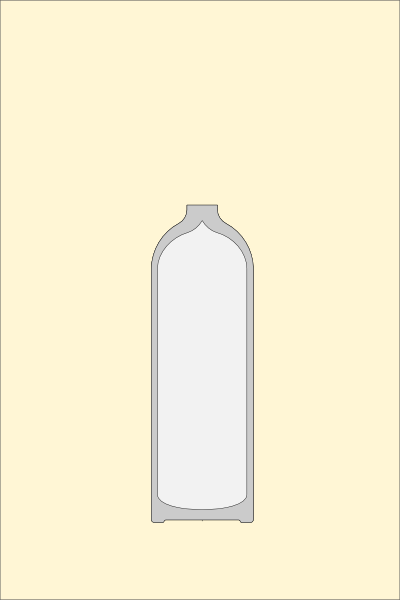
Section after closure of the top end

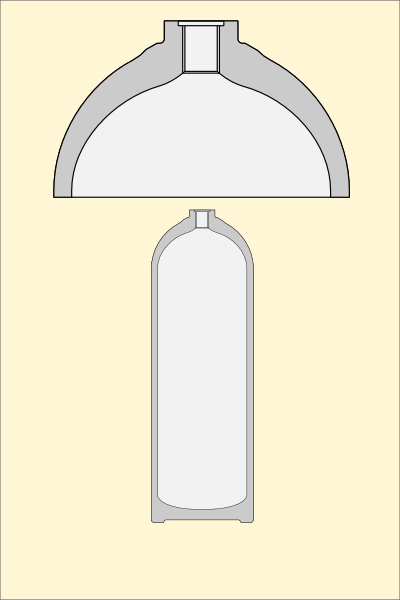
Section showing machined areas of the neck in detail

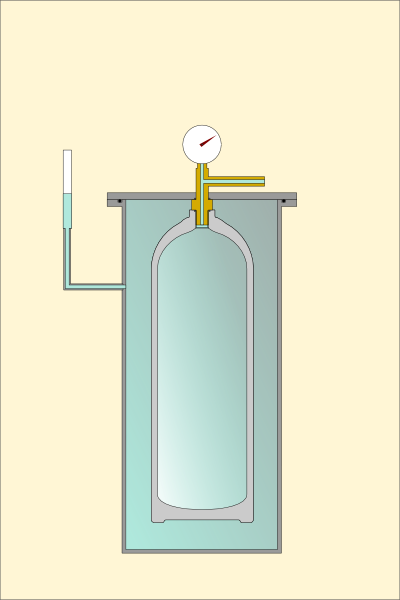
Hydrostatic test

==== Steel ====
Animation showing two stages of deep drawing of a steel plate to a cup, and a similar cup to a diving cylinder blank with domed bottom

In cold water diving, where a person wearing a highly buoyant thermally insulating dive suit has a large excess of buoyancy, steel cylinders are often used because they are denser than aluminium cylinders. They also often have a lower mass than aluminium cylinders with the same gas capacity, due to considerably higher material strength. As a result, the use of steel cylinders can result in both a lighter cylinder and less ballast required for the same gas capacity, a two-fold saving on overall dry weight carried by the diver. Steel cylinders are more susceptible than aluminium to external corrosion, particularly in seawater, and may be galvanized or coated with corrosion barrier paints to resist corrosion damage. It is not difficult to monitor external corrosion and repair the paint when damaged. Steel cylinders which are well maintained have a long service life, often longer than aluminium cylinders, as they are not susceptible to fatigue damage when filled within their safe working pressure limits.

Steel cylinders are manufactured with either domed (convex) or dished (concave) bottoms. The dished profile allows them to stand upright on a horizontal surface, and is the standard shape for industrial cylinders. The cylinders used for emergency gas supply on diving bells often have this shape, and commonly have a water capacity of about 50 litres ("J"). Domed bottoms give a larger volume for the same cylinder mass, and are the standard for scuba cylinders up to 18 litres water capacity, though some concave bottomed cylinders have been marketed for scuba. Steel cylinders with foot rings are made for industrial uses but are not legal for underwater use, as they corrode in the crevice between the foot ring and the cylinder, and cannot be effectively visually inspected in this area.

Steel alloys used for dive cylinder manufacture are authorised by the manufacturing standard. For example, the US standard DOT 3AA requires the use of open-hearth, basic oxygen, or electric steel of uniform quality. Approved alloys include 4130X, NE-8630, 9115, 9125, Carbon-boron and Intermediate manganese, with specified constituents, including manganese and carbon, and molybdenum, chromium, boron, nickel or zirconium.

Steel cylinders may be manufactured from steel plate discs, which are cold drawn to a cylindrical cup form, in two or three stages, and generally have a domed base if intended for the scuba market, so they cannot stand up by themselves. After forming the base and side walls, the top of the cylinder is trimmed to length, heated and hot spun to form the shoulder and close the neck. This process thickens the material of the shoulder. The cylinder is heat-treated by quenching and tempering to provide the best strength and toughness. The cylinders are machined to provide the neck thread and o-ring seat (if applicable), then chemically cleaned or shot-blasted inside and out to remove mill scale. After inspection and hydrostatic testing, they are stamped with the required permanent markings, coated externally with a corrosion barrier paint or hot-dip galvanised, and then given a final inspection.

An alternative production method is backward extrusion of a heated steel billet, similar to the cold extrusion process for aluminium cylinders, followed by hot drawing and bottom forming to reduce wall thickness, and trimming of the top edge in preparation for shoulder and neck formation by hot spinning. The other processes are much the same for all production methods.

A third method is to start with seamless steel tube of a suitable diameter and wall thickness, manufactured by a process such as the Mannesmann process, and to close both ends by the hot spinning process. When a neck opening is only required at one end, the base is spun first and dressed inside for a uniform smooth surface, then the process of closing the shoulder and forming the neck is the same as for the pressed plate method.

==== Cylinder neck ====
The neck of the cylinder is the part of the end which is shaped as a narrow concentric cylinder, and internally threaded to fit a cylinder valve. Cylinder thread may be in either of two basic configurations: Taper thread or parallel thread. Parallel threads are more tolerant of repeated removal and refitting of the valve for inspection and testing. The valve thread specification must exactly match the neck thread specification of the cylinder, as improperly matched (Note: Some of the thread sizes are similar enough to be mismatched by someone unfamiliar with a proper fit. See #Accidents.) neck threads can fail under pressure and can have fatal consequences. The valve pressure rating must be compatible with the cylinder pressure rating.

There are several standards for scuba cylinder neck threads, these include:

- Taper thread (17E), with a 12% taper right hand thread, standard Whitworth 55° form with a pitch of 14 threads per inch (5.5 threads per cm) and pitch diameter at the top thread of the cylinder of 18.036 millimetres (0.71 in). These connections are sealed using thread tape and torqued to between 120 and 150 newton-metres (89 and 111 lbf⋅ft) on steel cylinders, and between 75 and 140 N⋅m (55 and 103 lbf⋅ft) on aluminium cylinders.
- Other taper thread standards for connection of valves to gas cylinder necks of current validity and historical use exist, and some are interchangeable, while others are not. The vary in nominal diameter, thread form, and taper angle.

Parallel threads are made to several standards:

- M25x2 ISO parallel thread, which is sealed by an O-ring and torqued to 100 to 130 N⋅m (74 to 96 lbf⋅ft) on steel, and 95 to 130 N⋅m (70 to 96 lbf⋅ft) on aluminum cylinders;
- M18x1.5 parallel thread, which is sealed by an O-ring, and torqued to 100 to 130 N⋅m (74 to 96 lbf⋅ft) on steel cylinders, and 85 to 100 N⋅m (63 to 74 lbf⋅ft) on aluminum cylinders;
- 3/4"x14 BSP parallel thread, which has a 55° Whitworth thread form, a pitch diameter of 25.279 millimetres (0.9952 in) and a pitch of 14 threads per inch (1.814 mm);
- 3/4"x14 NGS (NPSM) parallel thread, sealed by an O-ring, torqued to 40 to 50 N⋅m (30 to 37 lbf⋅ft) on aluminium cylinders, which has a 60° thread form, a pitch diameter of 0.9820 to 0.9873 in (24.94 to 25.08 mm), and a pitch of 14 threads per inch (5.5 threads per cm);
- 3/4"x16 UNF, sealed by an O-ring, torqued to 40 to 50 N⋅m (30 to 37 lbf⋅ft) on aluminium cylinders.
- 7/8"x14 UNF, sealed by an O-ring.

The 3/4"NGS and 3/4"BSP are very similar, having the same pitch, and a pitch diameter that only differs by about 0.2 mm (0.008 in), but they are not compatible, as the thread forms are different.

All parallel thread valves use an O-ring at the top of the neck thread which seals in a chamfer or step in the cylinder neck and against the flange of the valve.

Large cylinders such as those used for bell emergency gas generally use 25E taper thread to "ISO 11363-1, Gas cylinders – 17E and 25E taper threads for connection of valves to gas cylinders – Part 1: Specifications".

==== Permanent markings ====
The shoulder of the cylinder carries stamp markings providing required information about the cylinder.

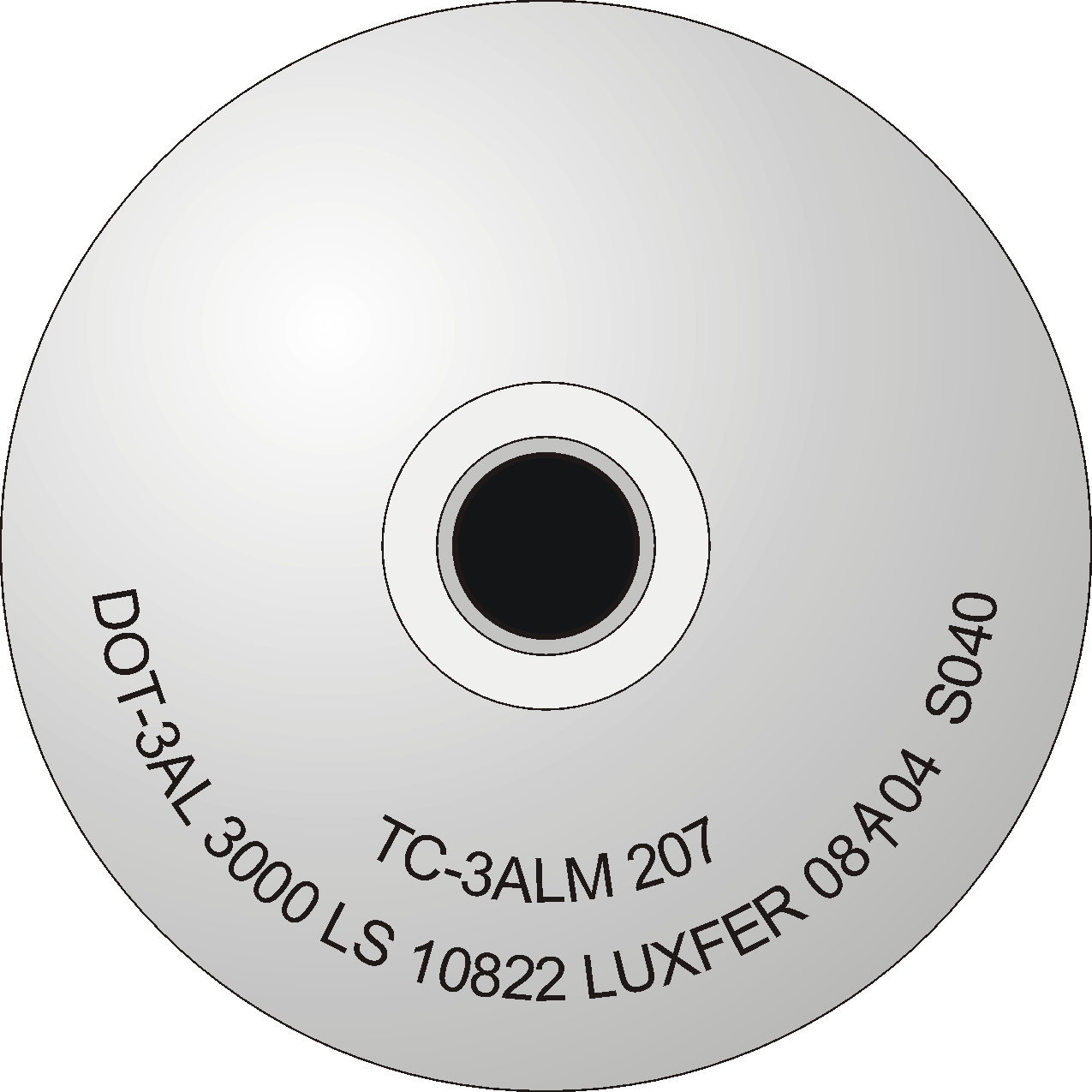
Stamp markings on an American manufacture aluminum 40 cu ft 3000 psi cylinder

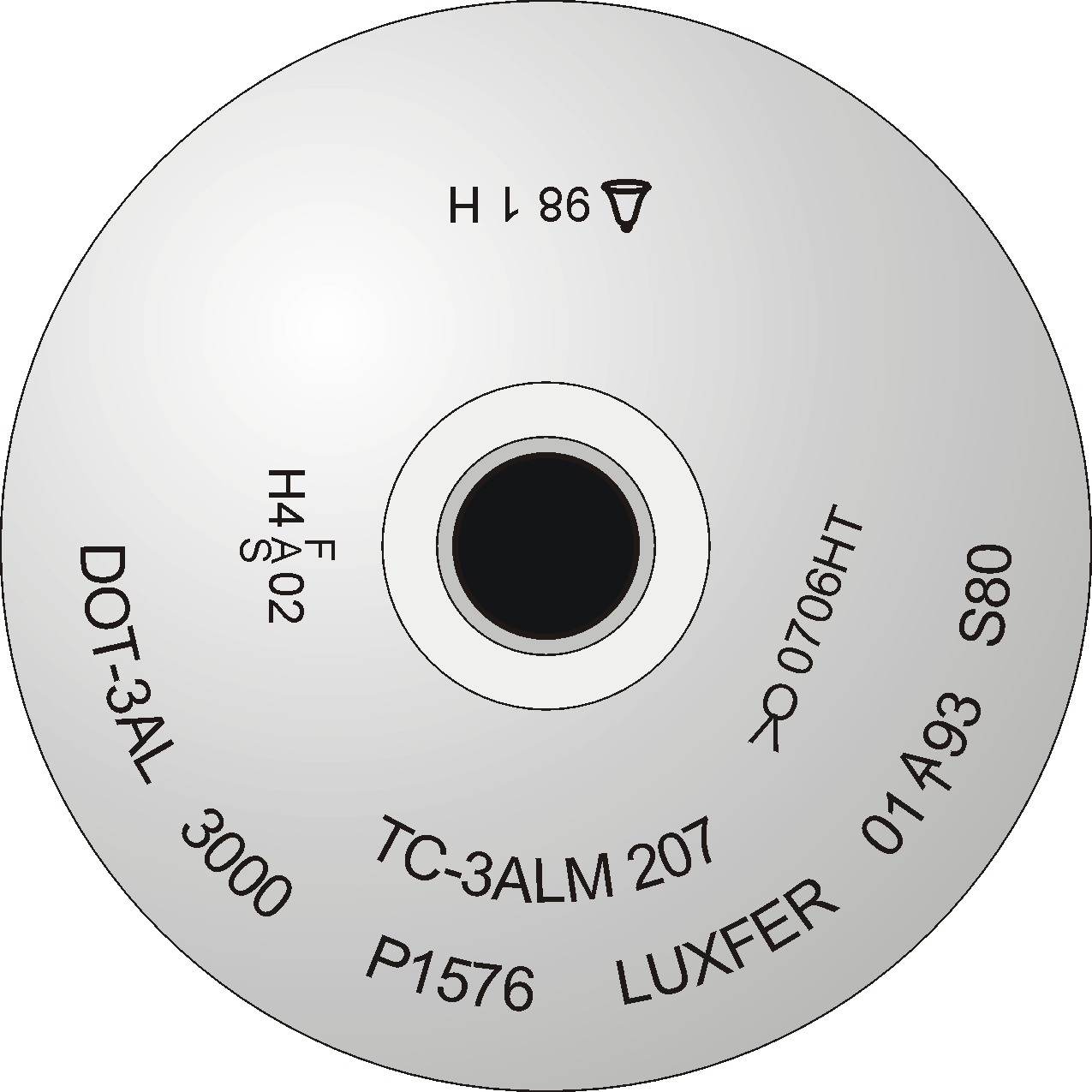
Stamp markings on an American manufacture aluminum 80 cu ft 3000 psi cylinder

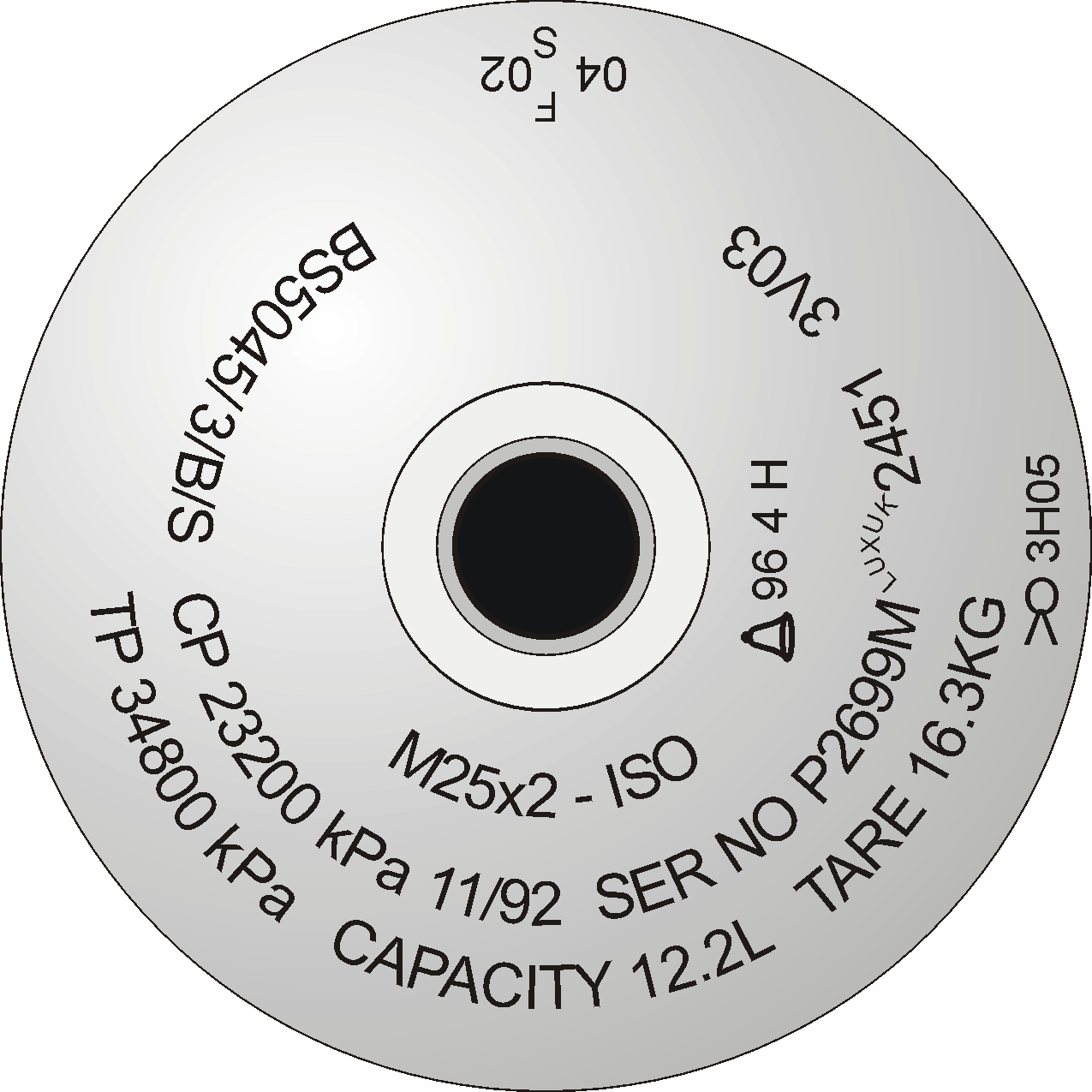
Stamp markings on a British-manufacture aluminium 12.2-litre 232-bar cylinder

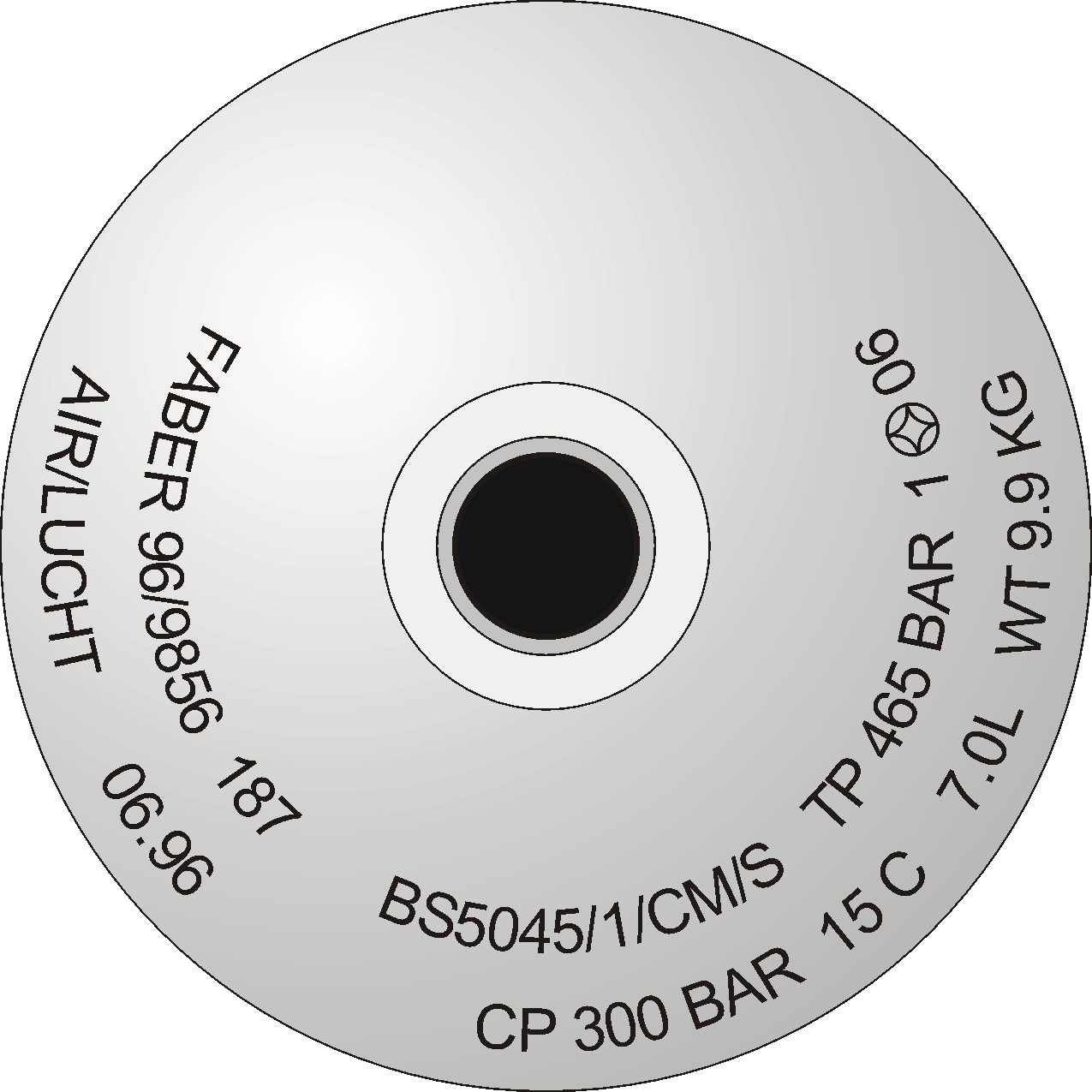
Stamp markings on an Italian manufacture steel 7-litre 300-bar cylinder

Universally required markings include:

- Identification of the manufacturer
- Manufacturing standard, which will identify the material specification
- Serial number
- Date of manufacture and initial validation
- Charging pressure
- Capacity
- Mark of the accredited testing agency
- Date of each re-validation test

A variety of other markings may be required by national regulations, or may be optional.

=== The cylinder valve ===
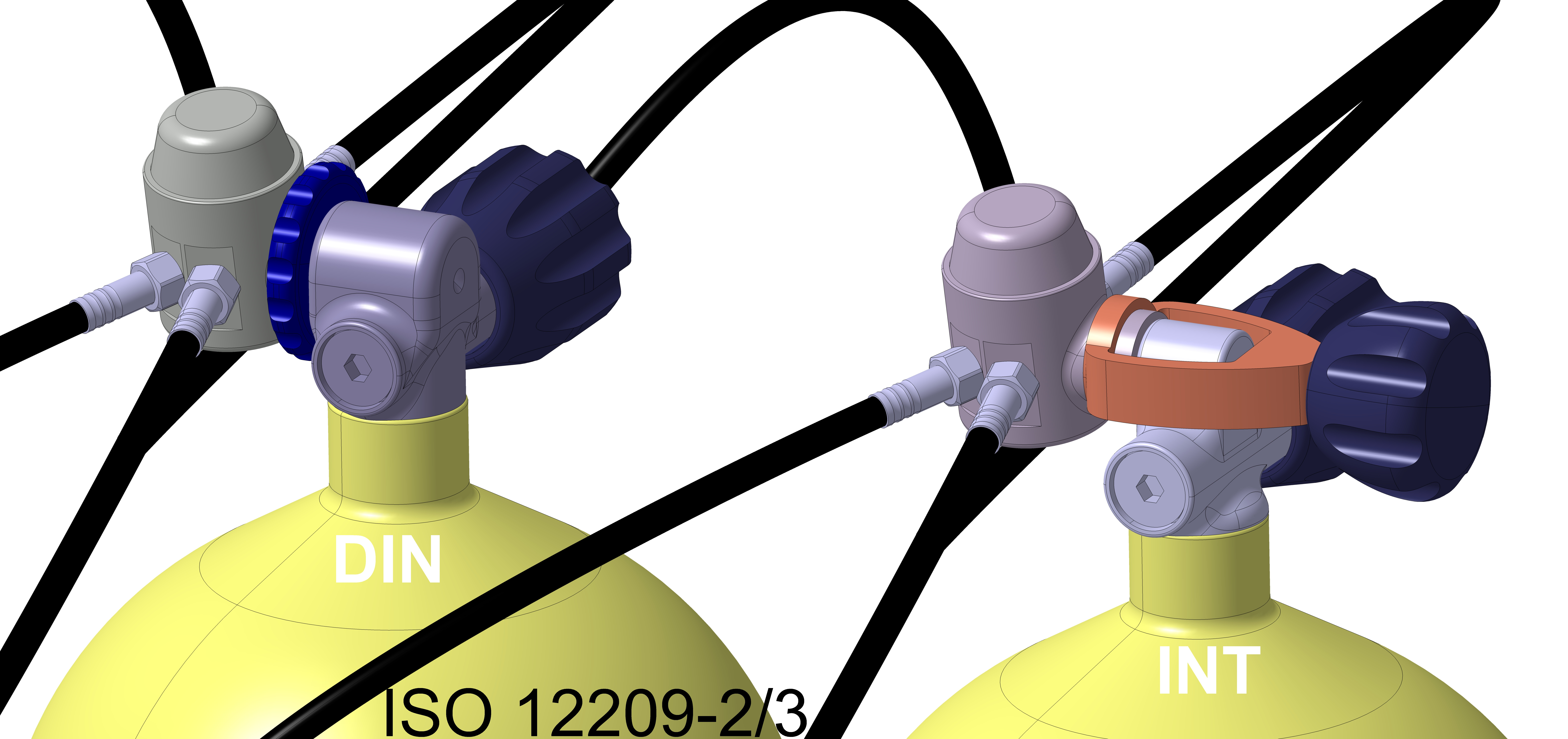
Regulators with DIN-valve (left) and yoke-valve (right)

The purpose of the cylinder valve or pillar valve is to control gas flow to and from the pressure vessel and to provide a connection with the regulator or filling hose. Cylinder valves are usually machined from brass and finished by a protective and decorative layer of chrome plating. A metal or plastic dip tube or valve snorkel screwed into the bottom of the valve extends into the cylinder to reduce the risk of liquid or particulate contaminants in the cylinder getting into the gas passages when the cylinder is inverted, which could block or jam the regulator.

Cylinder valves are classified by four basic aspects: the thread specification, the connection to the regulator, pressure rating, and other distinguishing features. Standards relating to the specifications and manufacture of cylinder valves include ISO 10297 and CGA V-9 Standard for Gas Cylinder Valves. The other distinguishing features include outlet configuration, handedness and valve spindle orientation, number of outlets and valves (1 or 2), shape of the valve body, presence of a reserve valve, manifold connections, and the presence of a bursting disk overpressure relief device.

== Accessories ==
Additional components for convenience, protection, or other functions, not directly required for the function as a pressure vessel.

=== Manifolds ===
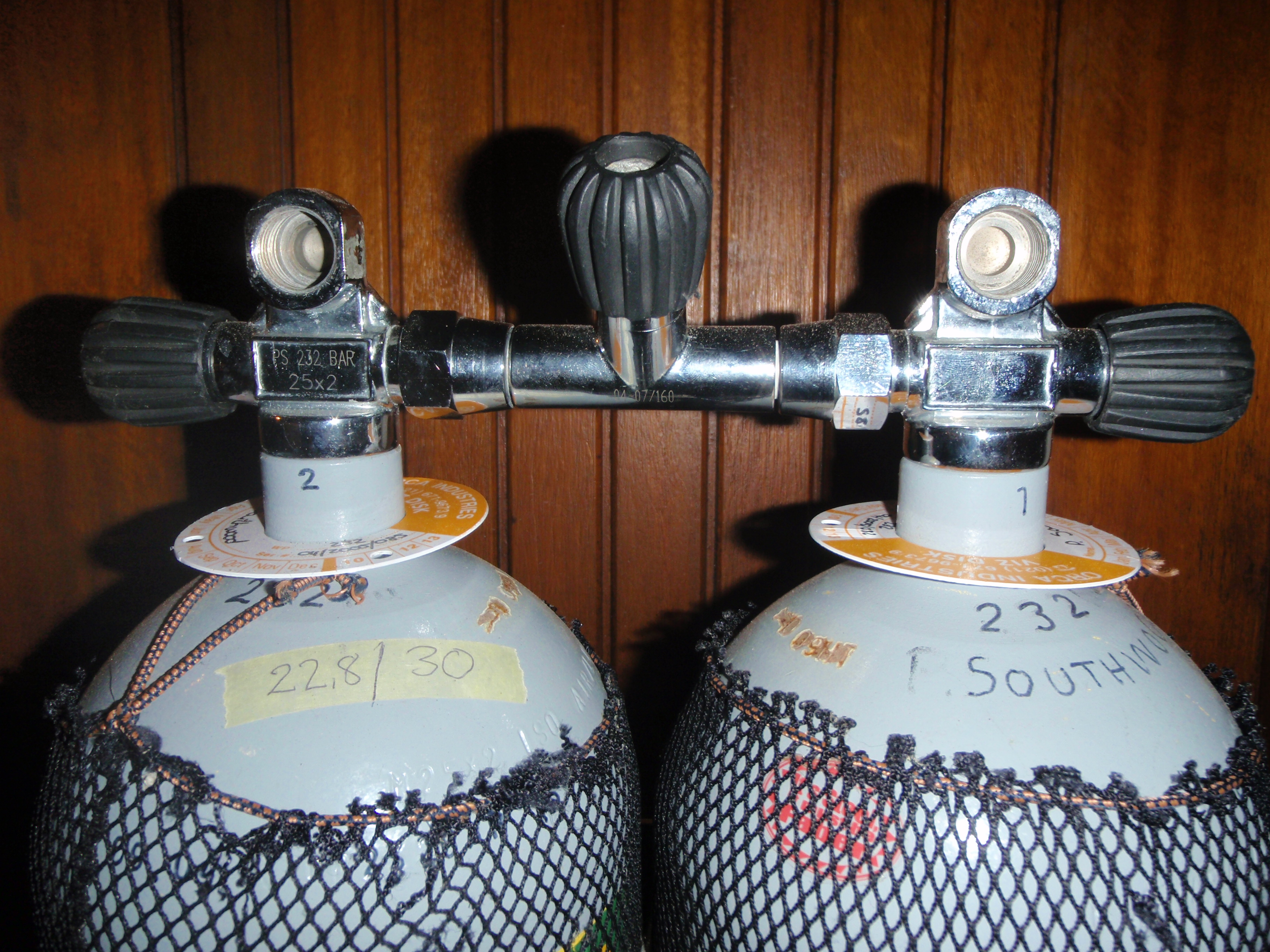
Face sealed isolation manifold on twin 12 L steel cylinders. The plastic discs are records of the latest internal inspection

A cylinder manifold is a tube which connects two or more cylinders together so that the contents of all can be supplied to one or more regulators or distribution systems. There are three commonly used configurations of scuba manifold. The oldest type is a tube with a connector on each end which is attached to the cylinder valve outlet, and an outlet connection in the middle, to which the regulator is attached. A variation on this pattern includes a reserve valve at the outlet connector. The cylinders are isolated from the manifold when the valves are closed, and the manifold can be attached or disconnected while the cylinders are pressurised.

More recently, manifolds have become available which connect the cylinders on the cylinder side of the valve, leaving the outlet connection of the cylinder valve available for connection of a regulator. This means that the manifold connection cannot be made or broken while the cylinders are pressurised, as there is no valve to isolate the manifold from the interior of the cylinder. This apparent inconvenience allows a regulator to be connected to each cylinder, and isolated from the internal pressure independently, which allows a malfunctioning regulator on one cylinder to be isolated while still allowing the regulator on the other cylinder access to all the gas in both cylinders. These manifolds may be plain or may include an isolation valve in the manifold, which allows the contents of the cylinders to be isolated from each other. This allows the contents of one cylinder to be isolated and secured for the diver if a leak at the cylinder neck thread, manifold connection, or burst disk on the other cylinder causes its contents to be lost. A relatively uncommon manifold system is a connection which screws directly into the neck threads of both cylinders, and has a single valve to release gas to a connector for a regulator. These manifolds can include a reserve valve, either in the main valve or at one cylinder. This system is mainly of historical interest.

=== Valve cages ===
A valve cage, also known as a manifold cage or regulator cage, can be clamped to the neck of a single cylinder or to manifolded cylinders, shielding the valves and first-stage regulators from impact and abrasion damage during use, and preventing accidental valve closure caused by the handwheel rubbing against an overhead surface (roll-off). A valve cage is typically made of stainless steel.

=== Cylinder bands ===
Cylinder bands, or tank bands, are straps, usually of stainless steel, which are used to clamp two cylinders together as a twin set. The cylinders may be manifolded or independent. It is usual to use a cylinder band near the top of the cylinders, just below the shoulders, and one lower down. The conventional distance between centre-lines for bolting to a backplate is 11 inches (280 mm).

=== Cylinder boots ===
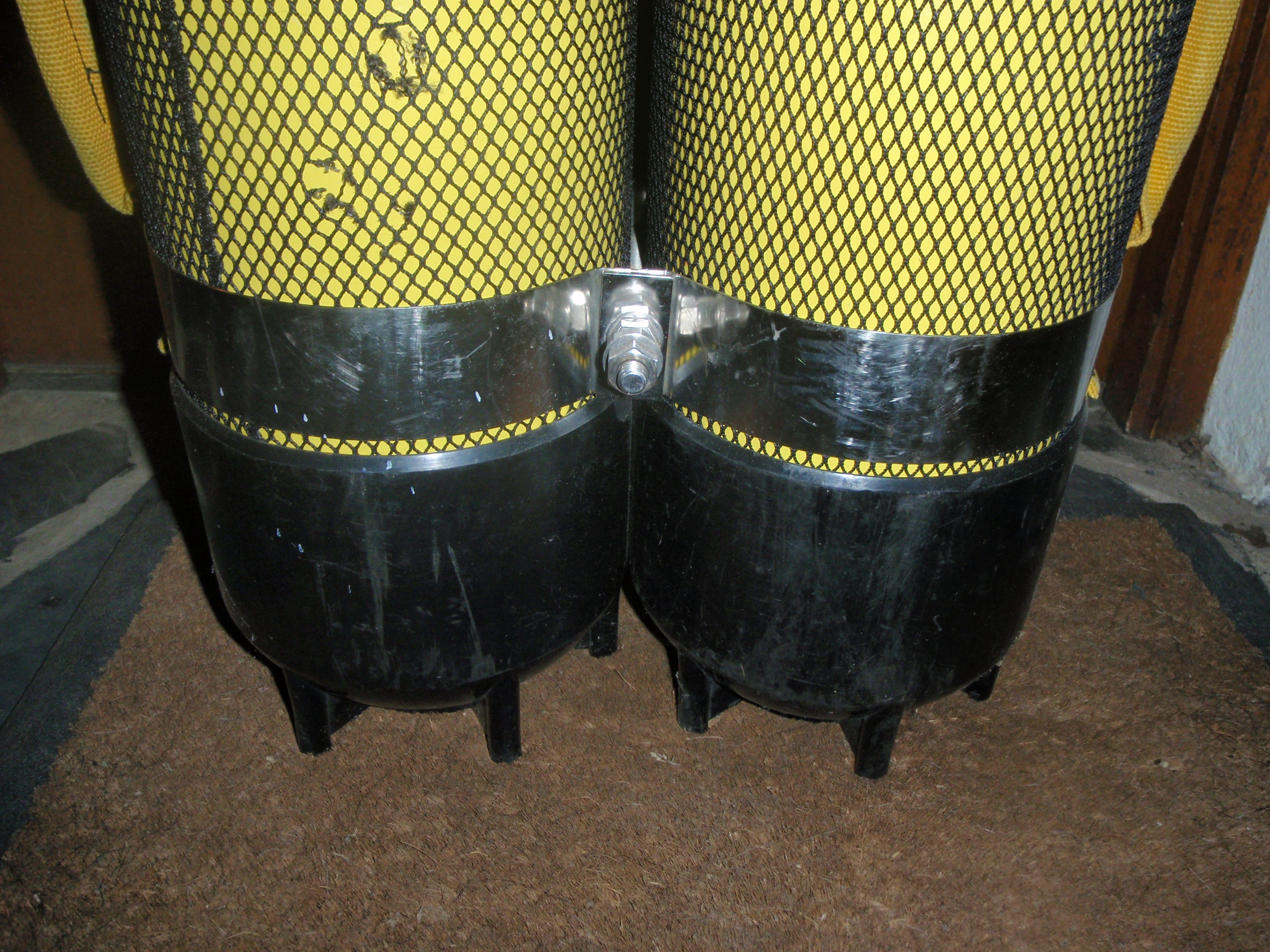
Twinned cylinders showing cylinder boots, nets and lower band

A cylinder boot is a hard rubber or plastic cover which fits over the base of a diving cylinder to protect the paint from abrasion and impact, to protect the surface the cylinder stands on from impact with the cylinder, and in the case of round bottomed cylinders, to allow the cylinder to stand upright on its base. Some boots have flats moulded into the plastic to reduce the tendency of the cylinder to roll on a flat surface. It is possible in some cases for water to be trapped between the boot and the cylinder, and if this is seawater and the paint under the boot is in poor condition, the surface of the cylinder may corrode in those areas. This can usually be avoided by rinsing in fresh water after use and storing in a dry place. The added hydrodynamic drag caused by a cylinder boot is trivial in comparison with the overall drag of the diver, but some boot styles may present a slightly increased risk of snagging on the environment.

=== Cylinder net ===
A cylinder net is a tubular net which is stretched over a cylinder and tied on at top and bottom. The function is to protect the paintwork from scratching, and on booted cylinders it also helps drain the surface between the boot and cylinder, which reduces corrosion problems under the boot. Mesh size is usually about 6 millimetres (0.24 in). Some divers will not use boots or nets as they can snag more easily than a bare cylinder and constitute an entrapment hazard in some environments such as caves and the interior of wrecks. Occasionally sleeves made from other materials may be used to protect the cylinder.

=== Cylinder handles ===
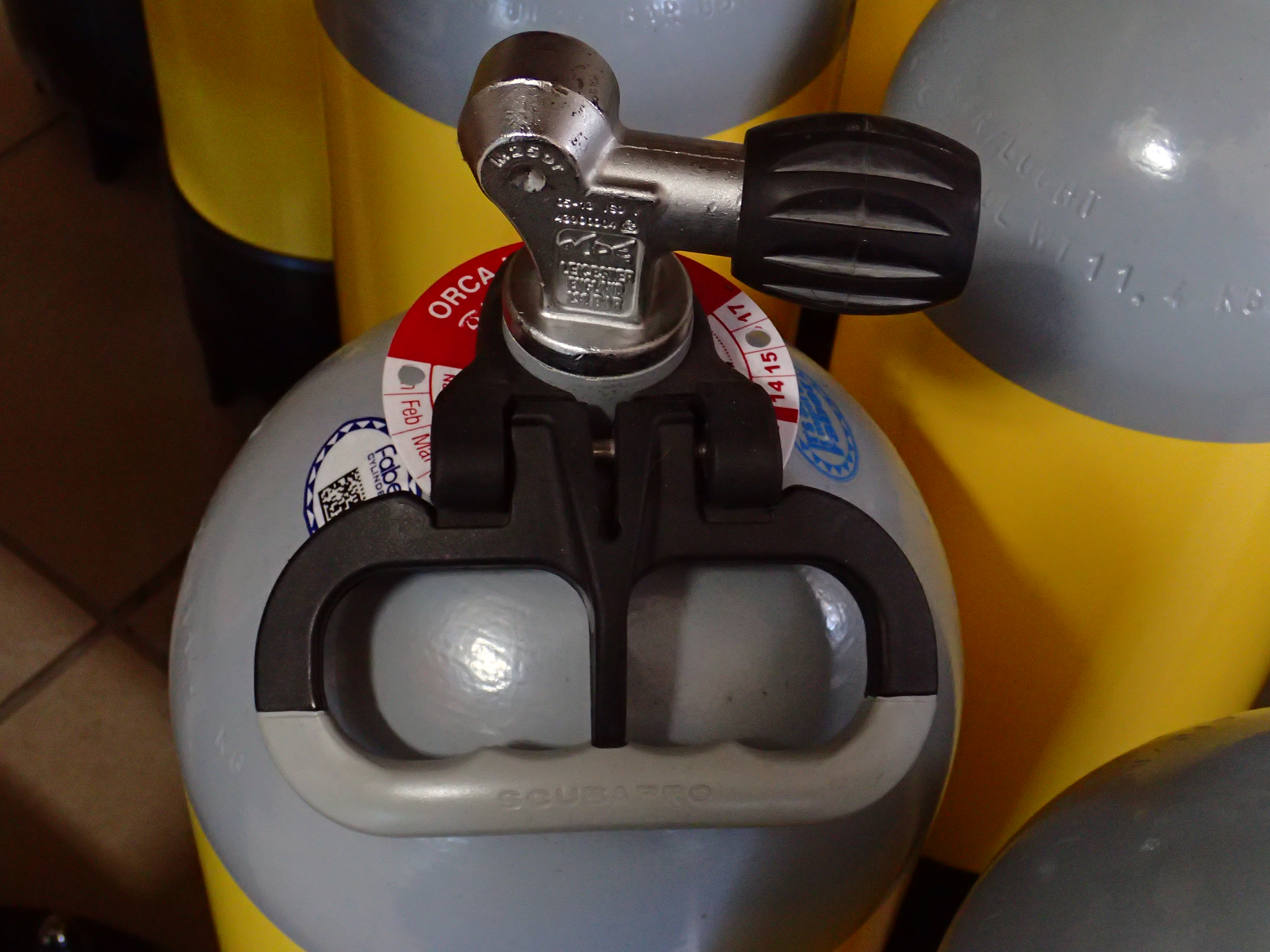
Plastic scuba cylinder handle

A cylinder handle may be fitted to a scuba cylinder, usually clamped to the neck, to conveniently carry the cylinder. This can also increase the risk of snagging in an enclosed environment. Handles that are clamped to the cylinder neck may be fixed or folding. Some may require the valve to be removed to allow fitting.

=== Dust caps and plugs ===
These are used to cover he cylinder valve orifice when the cylinder is not in use to prevent dust, water or other materials from contaminating the orifice. They can also help prevent the O-ring of a yoke type valve from falling out during storage and transport. A screw-in plug may be vented so that the leakage of gas from the cylinder does not pressurise the plug, making it difficult to remove.

== Pressure rating ==
Working pressure and cylinder volume determine the capacity of the cylinder to store gas. Many of the physical characteristics of the cylinder are consequences of these factors. Two other pressures are also relevant to cylinder use: Test pressure and developed pressure.

=== Working pressure ===
Working pressure is the maximum pressure that the cylinder is designed to tolerate indefinitely at reference temperature under normal operating conditions. It is determined during design and takes into account the material's strength, operating temperature range, and the working lifeespan. Diving cylinders are technically all high-pressure gas containers, but within the industry in the United States there are three nominal working pressure ratings (WP) in common use;

low pressure (2400 to 2640 psi — 165 to 182 bar),
standard (3000 psi — 207 bar), and
high pressure (3300 to 3500 psi — 227 to 241 bar).

US-made aluminum cylinders usually have a standard working pressure of 3,000 pounds per square inch (210 bar), and the compact aluminum range have a working pressure of 3,300 pounds per square inch (230 bar). Some steel cylinders manufactured to US standards are permitted to exceed the nominal working pressure by 10%, and this is indicated by a '+' symbol. This extra pressure allowance is dependent on the cylinder passing the appropriate higher-standard periodical hydrostatic test.

Those parts of the world using the metric system usually refer to the cylinder pressure directly in bar but would generally use "high pressure" to refer to a 300 bars (4,400 psi) working pressure cylinder, which can not be used with a yoke connector on the regulator. 232 bar is a very popular working pressure for scuba cylinders in both steel and aluminum.

=== Test pressure ===
Test pressure is the pressure used to validate that the cylinder is strong enough to withstand unintended occasional overpressurisation in service safely. It is also known as proof pressure. Hydrostatic test pressure (TP) is specified by the manufacturing standard. This is usually 1.5 × working pressure, or in the United States, 1.67 × working pressure.

=== Developed pressure ===
Cylinder working pressure is specified at a reference temperature, usually 15 °C or 20 °C. and cylinders also have a specified maximum safe working temperature, often 65 °C. The actual pressure in the cylinder will vary with temperature, as described by the gas laws, but this is acceptable in terms of the standards provided that the developed pressure when corrected to the reference temperature does not exceed the specified working pressure stamped on the cylinder. This allows cylinders to be safely and legally filled to a pressure that is higher than the specified working pressure when the filling temperature is greater than the reference temperature, but not more than 65 °C, provided that the filling pressure does not exceed the developed pressure for that temperature, and cylinders filled according to this provision will be at the correct working pressure when cooled to the reference temperature.

=== Pressure monitoring ===
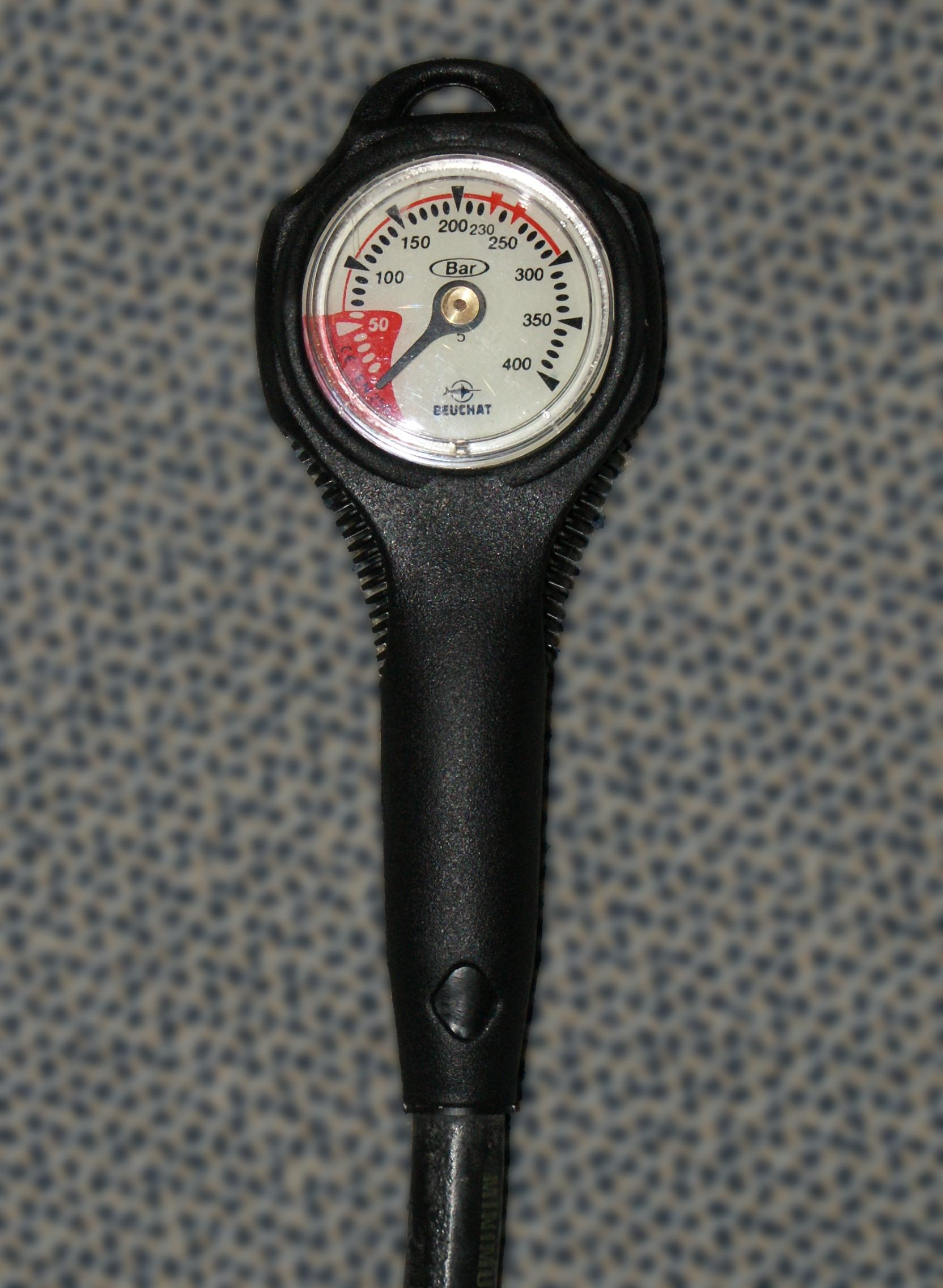
Typical submersible pressure gauge

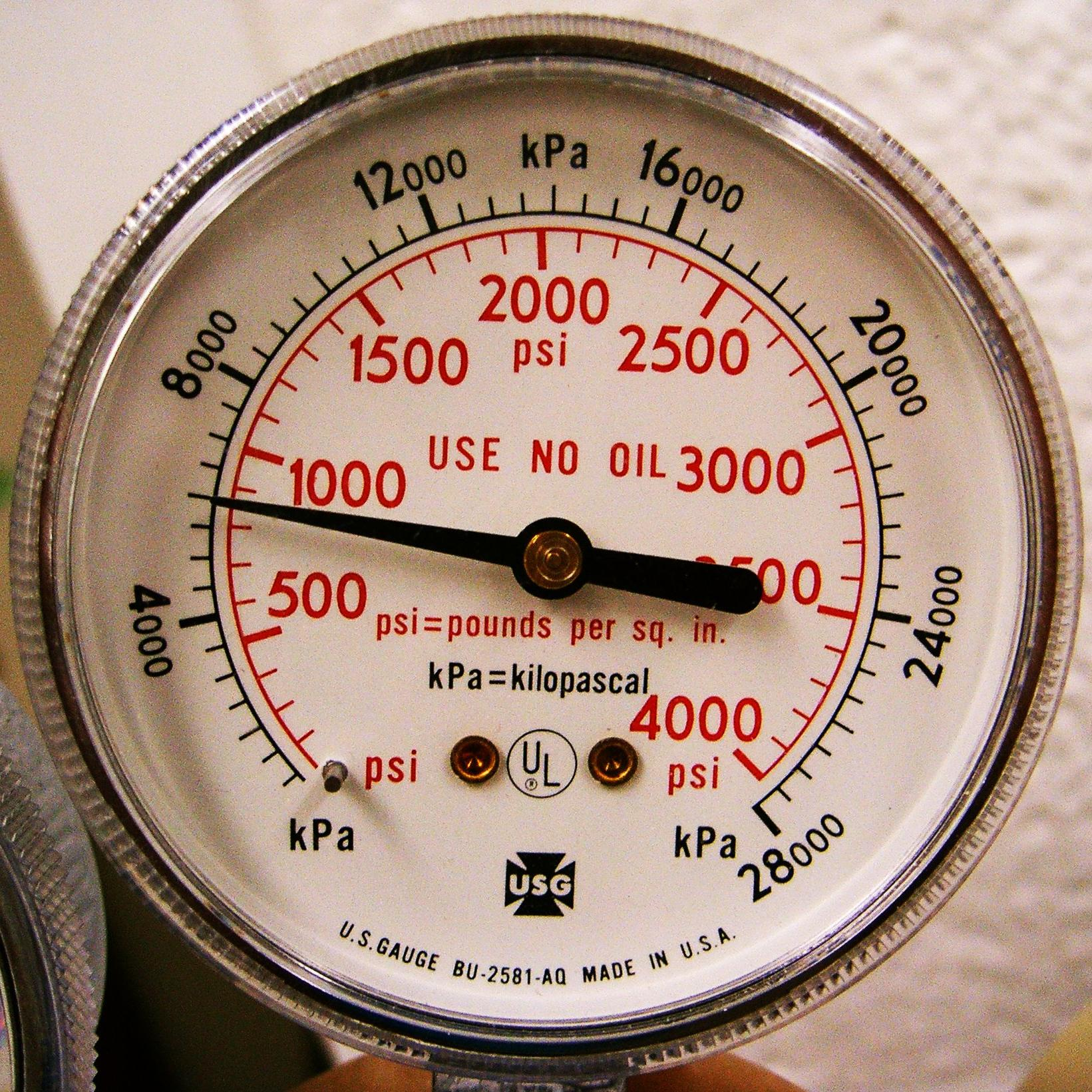
The face of this US-made cylinder pressure gauge is calibrated in pounds per square inch in red and kilopascals in black.

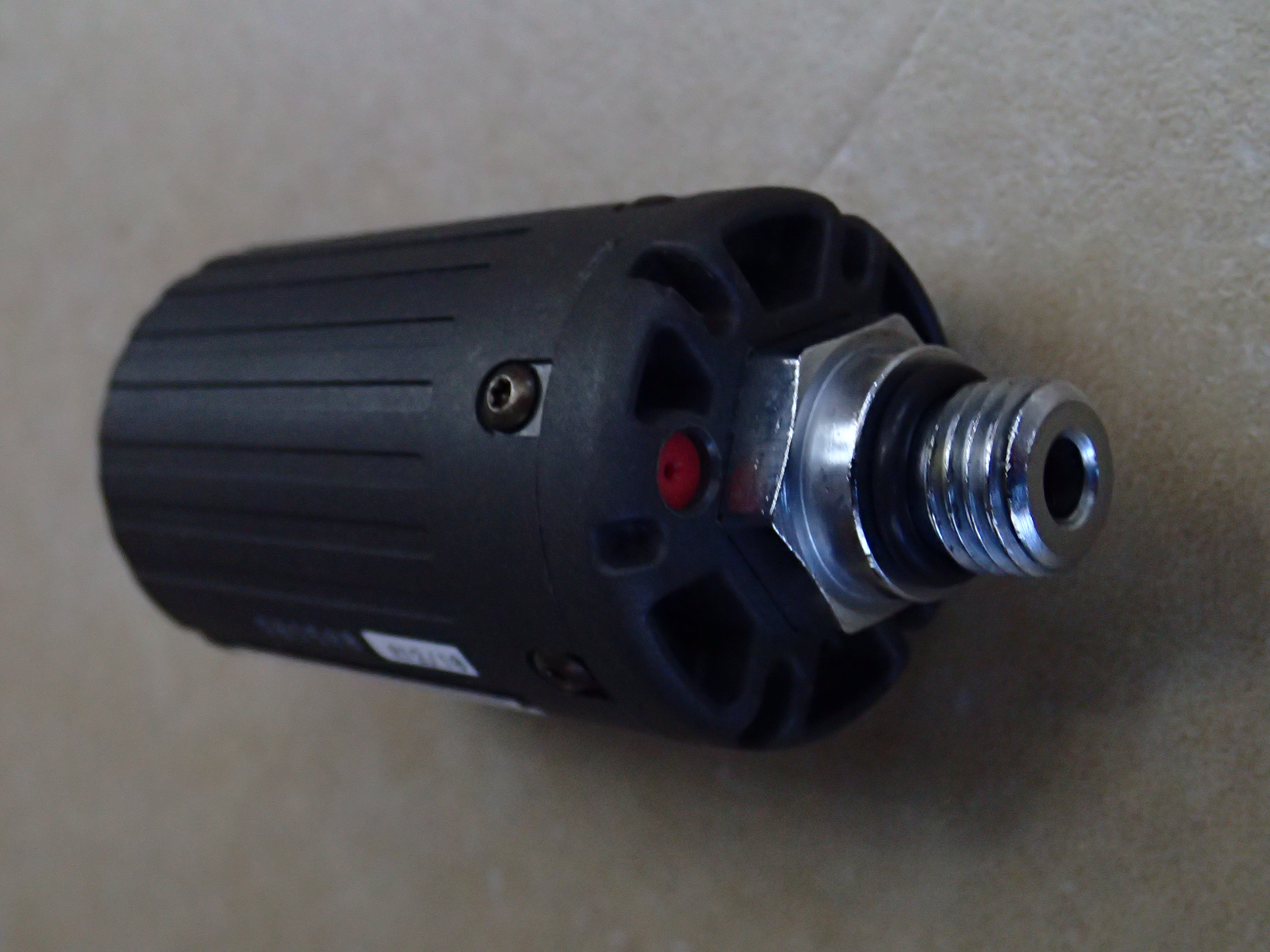
Submersible wireless pressure transmitter for remote dive computer display

The pressure of the contents of a diving cylinder is used as an indication of the amount of gas contained by the cylinder. It is measured at several stages during filling. It is checked before filling, monitored during filling, and checked when filling is completed. This can all be done with the pressure gauge on the filling equipment.

Pressure in a scuba cylinder is also monitored by the diver during a dive. Firstly as a check of contents before use, then during use to ensure that there is enough left at all times to allow a safe completion of the dive, and often after a dive for purposes of record keeping and personal consumption rate calculation. Bell emergency gas supplies are monitored from the bell gas panel using pressure gauges and may also use an electronic contents gauge which transmits the pressures to a surface control panel.

The pressure is also monitored during hydrostatic testing to ensure that the test is done to the correct pressure.

Most diving cylinders do not have a dedicated pressure gauge, but they are a standard feature on most diving regulators, and a requirement on all filling facilities. An alternative method of monitoring cylinder pressure during a dive is by means of a wireless pressure transmitter on the regulator first stage monitored by an air-integrated dive computer.

There are two widespread standards for pressure measurement of diving gas. In the United States the pressure is measured in pounds per square inch (psi), and most of the rest of the world uses bar. Sometimes gauges may be calibrated in other metric units, such as kilopascal (kPa) or megapascal (MPa), or in atmospheres (atm, or ATA), particularly gauges not actually used underwater.

== Size ==
The most common dimension considered is the capacity for gas storage, but linear dimensions, mass and buoyancy are also important when carried by the diver.

=== Capacity ===
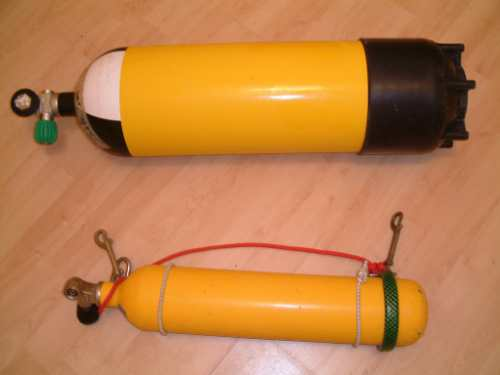
12-litre and 3-litre steel diving cylinders: typical primary and pony sizes

There are two commonly used conventions for describing the capacity of a diving cylinder. One is based on the internal volume of the cylinder. The other is based on nominal volume of gas stored.

==== Internal volume ====
The internal volume is commonly quoted in most countries using the metric system. This information is required by ISO 13769 to be stamped on the cylinder shoulder. It can be measured easily by filling the cylinder with fresh water. This has resulted in the alternative term 'water capacity', abbreviated as WC which is often stamp marked on the cylinder shoulder. It is almost always expressed as a volume in litres, but sometimes as mass of the water in kg. Fresh water has a density close to one kilogram per litre so the numerical values are effectively identical at two decimal places accuracy.

These are representative examples of standard sizes by internal volume, for a larger range, the catalogues of the manufacturers may be consulted. The applications are typical, but not exclusive.

- 50 litres: Available in steel, 200 and 300 bar, a common size for bell onboard emergency gas.
- 22 litres: Available in steel, 200 and 232 bar, Occasionally used for back gas.
- 20 litres: Available in steel, 200 and 232 bar, Occasionally used for back gas.
- 18 litres: Available in steel, 200 and 232 bar, used as singles or occasionally twins for back gas.
- 16 litres: Available in steel, 200 and 232 bar, used as single or twins for back gas.
- 15 litres: Available in steel, 200 and 232 bar, used as singles or twins for back gas
- 12.2 litres: Available in steel 232, 300 bar and aluminium 232 bar, used as singles or twins for back gas
- 12 litres: Available in steel 200, 232, 300 bar, and aluminium 232 bar, used as singles or twins for back gas
- 11 litres: Available in aluminium 200, 232 bar, used as single or twins for back gas or sidemount.
- 10.2 litres: Available in aluminium, 232 bar, used as single or twins for back gas
- 10 litres: Available in steel, 200, 232 and 300 bar, used as single or twins for back gas, and for bailout
- 9.4 litres: Available in aluminium, 232 bar, used for back gas or as slings
- 8 litres: Available in steel, 200 bar, used for semi-closed rebreathers, sidemount and back gas by smaller people
- 7 litres: Available in steel, 200, 232 and 300 bar, and aluminium 232 bar, back gas as singles and twins, and as bailout cylinders.
- 6 litres: Available in steel, 200, 232, 300 bar, used for back gas as singles and twins, and as bailout cylinders.
- 5.5 litres: Available in steel, 200 and 232 bar, used for bailout cylinders.
- 5 litres: Available in steel, 200 bar, used for rebreathers and bailout cylinders
- 4 litres: Available in steel, 200 bar, used for rebreathers and bailout cylinders
- 3 litres: Available in steel, 200 bar, used for rebreathers and bailout cylinders
- 2 litres: Available in steel, 200 bar, used for rebreathers, bailout cylinders, and suit inflation
- 1.5 litres: Available in steel, 200 and 232 bar, used for suit inflation
- 0.5 litres: Available in steel and aluminium, 200 bar, used for buoyancy compensator and surface marker buoy inflation
- 0.1 litres: Available in Aluminium: Used for decompression buoy inflation

==== Nominal volume ====
The nominal volume of gas stored is commonly quoted as the cylinder capacity in the USA. It is a measure of the volume of gas that can be released from the full cylinder at atmospheric pressure. Terms used for the capacity include 'free gas volume' or 'free gas equivalent'. It depends on the internal volume and the working pressure of a cylinder. If the working pressure is higher, the cylinder will store more gas in the same internal volume.

The actual working pressure in use is not necessarily the same as the nominal working pressure stamped on the cylinder. Some steel cylinders manufactured to US standards are permitted to exceed the nominal working pressure by 10%, and this is indicated by a '+' symbol. This extra pressure allowance is dependent on the cylinder passing the appropriate periodical hydrostatic test and is not necessarily valid for US cylinders exported to countries with differing standards. The nominal gas content of these cylinders is based on the 10% higher pressure.

For example, a steel cylinder manufactured to the DOT 3AA standard, with a rated working pressure of 2,400 pounds per square inch (170 bar) with a '+' mark can be legally filled to 2,640 pounds per square inch (182 bar) provided it has passed the more stringent hydrostatic test procedure required for revalidation of the '+' rating. If this cylinder is rated as 80 cubic feet (2,300 L), that will be the volume of gas at atmospheric pressure that it can hold at the '+' rated pressure. At the nominal working pressure of 2400 pounds per square inch it will only hold 72.7 cubic feet of atmospheric pressure air.

As a counterexample, the common Aluminum 80 (Al80) cylinder is an aluminum cylinder which has a nominal 'free gas' capacity of 80 cubic feet (2,300 L) when pressurized to 3,000 pounds per square inch (210 bar), as there is no '+' rating applicable to aluminium cylinders. It has an internal volume of approximately 11 litres (0.39 ft^{3}).

Standard sizes by volume of gas stored: This system of size specification is usually used in the US.

- Aluminum C100 is a large (13.l l), high-pressure (3,300 pounds per square inch (228 bar)) cylinder. Heavy at 42.0 pounds (19.1 kg).
- Aluminum S80 is probably the most common cylinder, used by resorts in many parts of the world for back gas, but also popular as a sling cylinder for decompression gas, and as side-mount cylinder in fresh water, as it has nearly neutral buoyancy. These cylinders have an internal volume of approximately 11 litres (0.39 ft^{3}) and working pressure of 3,000 pounds per square inch (207 bar). They are also sometimes used as manifolded twins for back mount, but in this application the diver needs more ballast weights than with most steel cylinders of equivalent capacity.
- Aluminium C80 is the high-pressure equivalent, with a water capacity of 10.3 L and working pressure 3,300 pounds per square inch (228 bar).
- Aluminum S63 (9.0 L) 3,000 pounds per square inch (207 bar), and steel HP65 (8.2 L) are smaller and lighter than the Al80, but have a lower capacity, and are suitable for smaller divers or shorter dives.
- Aluminum S40 is a popular cylinder for side-mount and sling mount bailout and decompression gas for moderate depths, as it is small diameter and nearly neutral buoyancy, which makes it relatively unobtrusive for this mounting style. Internal volume is approximately 5.8 litres (0.20 ft^{3}) and working pressure 3,000 pounds per square inch (207 bar).
- Aluminium S30 (4.3 L) 3,000 pounds per square inch (207 bar),
- Aluminium S19 (2.7 L), 3,000 pounds per square inch (207 bar),
- Aluminium S13 (1.9 L), 3,000 pounds per square inch (207 bar),
- Steel LP80 2,640 pounds per square inch (182 bar) and HP80 (10.1 L) at 3,442 pounds per square inch (237 bar) are both more compact and lighter than the Aluminium S80 and are both negatively buoyant, which reduces the amount of ballast weight required by the diver.
- Steel HP119 (14.8 L), HP120 (15.3 L) and HP130 (16.0 L) cylinders provide larger amounts of gas for nitrox or technical diving.

=== Linear dimensions ===
Linear dimensions capture the outside diameter (OD), wall thickness, and end thickness of a bare cylinder, as the sizes of valves and other accessories vary. Cylinders made from seamless steel and aluminium alloys are described here. The constraints on filament wound composite cylinders will differ.

There are a small number of standardised outside diameters as this is cost effective for manufacture, because most of the same tooling can be shared between cylinders of the same diameter and wall thickness. A limited number of standard diameters is also convenient for sharing accessories such as manifolds, boots and tank bands. Volume within a series with a given outside diameter is controlled by wall thickness, which is consistent for material, pressure class, design standard, and length, which is the basic variable for controlling volume within a series. Mass is determined by these factors and the density of the material. Steel cylinders are available in the following size classes, among others:

- OD = 83 mm, 0.8 to 1.8 litres
- OD = 100 mm, 2.0 to 4.75 litres
- OD = 115 mm, 2.5 to 5.0 litres
- OD = 140 mm, 4.0 to 15.0 litres
- OD = 160 mm, 6.0 to 16.0 litres
- OD = 171 mm, 8.0 to 23.0 litres
- OD = 178 mm, 8.0 to 35.0 litres
- OD = 204 mm, 10.0 to 40.0 litres
- OD = 229 mm, 20.0 to 50.0 litres
- OD = 267 mm, 33.0 to 80.0 litres

Wall thickness varies depending on location, material, pressure rating, and practical considerations. The walls of the cylindrical section are designed to withstand the stresses from a large number of cycles to test pressure, with allowances for minor material loss from general corrosion, small areas of local damage from abrasion and normal wear, and limited depths of damage from pitting, line corrosion, or other physical impacts. The amount of damage and material loss allowed is compatible with the visual inspection rejection criteria. Steel cylinders are designed for test stresses to be below the fatigue limit for the alloy. The wall thickness is roughly proportional to diameter for a given test pressure and material strength – doubling the diameter will also double the basic wall thickness. Wall thickness is also proportional to working pressure and test pressure for a given diameter and material specification. The cylindrical section has the lowest wall thickness, and it is consistent within manufacturing tolerances for the entire cylindrical section.

End thickness of the base allows for considerably greater wear, impact, and corrosion on the bottom of the cylinder, while the shoulder is made thicker to allow for the variabilities inherent in the manufacturing process for closing the end, and for any stress raisers due to the process of permanent stamp marking. Bottom thickness distribution of a steel cylinder and shoulder thickness of all metal cylinders are influenced by the manufacturing process, and may be thicker than strictly necessary for strength and corrosion tolerance.

=== Mass ===
Faber steel cylinders carrying the CE mark have slightly decreased in mass for a given cylinder size from 2023. A 200-bar 15-litre cylinder with 203 mm-outside-diameter (8.0 in) with domed bottom, has reduced from 16.2 kg to 14.5 kg. The equivalent 232-bar cylinder reduced in mass from 18.2 to 16.7 kg.

=== Buoyancy ===
Buoyancy of a scuba cylinder is only of practical relevance in combination with the attached cylinder valve, scuba regulator and regulator accessories, as it will not be used underwater without them. These accessories are attached to the top of the cylinder, and both decrease the buoyancy of the combined unit and move the centre of gravity towards the top (valved end). This affects the cylinder orientation for sling and side mount. The mass of a seamless metal diving cylinder is concentrated in the ends, which are relatively thick walled and have a lower enclosed volume per unit mass. The details vary depending on the specification, but this tendency is common to both steel and aluminium cylinders, and is more extreme in flat or dished ends. As a consequence, long, narrow cylinders are less dense than short, wide cylinders for the same material and the same end configuration, while for the same internal volume, a short, wide cylinder is heavier than a long, narrow cylinder.

Back-mounted cylinder sets are generally not removed during a dive, and the buoyancy characteristics can be allowed for at the start of the dive, by ensuring that the diver has sufficient reserve buoyancy to float with the cylinders full, and sufficient ballast to remain submerged when the cylinders are all empty. The buoyancy compensator (BC), also called buoyancy control device (BCD), must be sufficient to provide some positive buoyancy at all depths with full cylinders. Adjustments to ballasting can compensate for other buoyancy variables. Inability to remain consistently immersed at the shallowest decompression stop can lead to incomplete decompression and increased risk of decompression sickness.

The change in buoyancy of a diving cylinder during a dive can be more problematic with side-mounted cylinders, and the actual buoyancy at any point during the dive is a consideration with any cylinder that may be separated from the diver for any reason. Cylinders which will be stage-dropped or handed off to another diver should not change the diver's buoyancy beyond what can be compensated using their buoyancy compensator. Cylinders with approximately neutral buoyancy when full generally require the least compensation when detached, as they are likely to be detached for staging or handed off when relatively full. This is less likely to be a problem for a solo diver's bailout set, as there will be fewer occasions to remove it during a dive. Side-mount sets for tight penetrations are expected to be swung forward or detached to pass through tight constrictions, and should not grossly affect trim or buoyancy during these maneuvers.

A major manufacturer of steel cylinders, Faber Industrie S.p.A., claim that their steel cylinders are neutral or slightly negative when empty, but do not specify which pressure rating this refers to, or whether this takes into account the cylinder valve.

Table showing the buoyancy of diving cylinders in water when empty and full of air
Cylinder specification			Air capacity		Weight in air		Buoyancy in water	
Material	Volume (litre)	Pressure (bar)	Volume (litre)	Weight (kg)	Empty (kg)	Full (kg)	Empty (kg)	Full (kg)
Steel	12	200	2400	3.0	16.0	19.0	-1.2	-4.2
Steel	15	200	3000	3.8	20.0	23.8	-1.4	-5.2
Steel	16 (XS 130)	230	3680	4.4	19.5	23.9	-0.9	-5.3
Steel	2x7	200	2800	3.4	19.5	23.0	-2.2	-5.6
Steel	8	300	2400	2.9	13.0	16.0	-3.6	-6.5
Steel	10	300	3000	3.6	17.0	20.8	-4.2	-7.8
Steel	2x4	300	2400	2.9	15.0	18.0	-4.1	-7.0
Steel	2x6	300	3600	4.4	21.0	25.6	-5.2	-9.6
Aluminium	9 (AL 63)	207	1863	2.3	12.2	13.5	+1.8	-0.5
Aluminium	11 (AL 80)	207	2277	2.8	14.4	17.2	+1.7	-1.1
Aluminium	13 (AL100)	207	2584	3.2	17.1	20.3	+1.4	-1.8
Assumes 1 litre of air at atmospheric pressure and 15 °C weighs 1.225 g. Cylinder, valve and manifold weights will vary depending on model, so actual values will vary accordingly.

== Applications ==
Diving cylinders are used in most diving modes where the diver breathes under the water. These include scuba diving, surface-oriented surface-supplied diving, saturation diving and atmospheric pressure diving. Divers may carry one cylinder or multiples, depending on the requirements of the dive. Where scuba diving takes place in low risk areas, where the diver may safely make a free ascent, or where a buddy is available to provide an alternative air supply in an emergency, recreational divers usually carry only one cylinder. Where diving risks are higher, for example where the visibility is low or when the dive is deeper or requires decompression stops, and particularly when diving under an overhead, divers routinely carry more than one gas source.

=== Open-circuit scuba ===
Open-circuit-demand scuba exhausts exhaled air to the environment, and requires each breath to be delivered to the diver on demand by a diving regulator, which reduces the pressure from the storage cylinder and supplies it through the demand valve when the diver reduces the pressure in the demand valve slightly during inhalation. For open-circuit scuba divers, there are several basic options for the combined cylinder and regulator system configuration.

Multiple gas mixtures may be carried in separate cylinders. Diving cylinders may serve different purposes. One or two cylinders may be used as a primary breathing source which is intended to be breathed from for most of the dive. A smaller cylinder carried in addition to a larger cylinder is called a "pony bottle". A cylinder to be used purely as an independent safety reserve is called a "bailout bottle" or emergency gas supply (EGS). A pony bottle is commonly used as a bailout bottle, but this would depend on the amount of gas and time required to surface.

Divers doing technical diving often carry different gases, each in a separate cylinder, for each phase of the dive:

- bottom gas is only breathed at depth. It is typically a helium-based gas which is low in oxygen (below 21%) or hypoxic (below 17%).
- decompression gas, or deco gas, is used during the ascent and at the decompression stops, and is generally one or more nitrox mixes with a high oxygen content, or pure oxygen, to accelerate decompression.
- travel gas is used during the descent and ascent. It is typically air or nitrox with an oxygen content between 21% and 40%. Travel gas is needed when the bottom gas is hypoxic and therefore is unsafe to breathe in shallow water. The travel gas may also be used as a decompression gas.
- stage gas is gas intended to be used in a particular stage of a dive, (Note: A stage or phase of a dive is a part of the dive in which a specific goal is pursues, task is done, or activity occurs, such as descent, exploration, survey, penetration, exit, ascent, decompression, ingassing, outgassing, or use of a specific gas mixture or a specific cylinder is planned.) and may be carried in a cylinder allocated for that purpose, holding a bottom, travel or decompression gas mixture, and usually includes a reserve. The cylinders are usually carried side-slung (sling-mounted), or side-mounted, clipped on either side of the diver to the harness of the backplate and wing or buoyancy compensator, rather than on the back, and may be left on the distance line to be picked up for use on return (stage dropped). The term "stage cylinder" originally implied that the cylinder was intended for use during a specific stage of the dive, but is also generically used for any independent open circuit scuba set other than back gas carried by a scuba diver. Commonly divers use aluminium stage cylinders, particularly in fresh water, because they are nearly neutrally buoyant and can be removed underwater with less effect on the diver's overall buoyancy.
- Suit inflation gas may be taken from a breathing gas cylinder or may be supplied from a small independent cylinder. Helium based gases are avoided for this use because they have a higher thermal conductivity. Argon can be used for this purpose as it is a better insulator than air.
- Bailout gas is sometimes carried in an additional independent scuba cylinder with its own regulator to mitigate out-of-air emergencies if the primary breathing gas supply should fail. For much common recreational diving where a controlled emergency swimming ascent is acceptably safe, this extra equipment is not needed or used. This extra cylinder is known as a bail-out cylinder, and may be carried in several ways, and can be any size that can hold enough gas to get the diver safely back to the surface.

=== Hand-off and drop cylinders ===
A hand-off cylinder is an open circuit scuba set, usually rigged for sling or side-mount, that can be passed (handed off) to another diver for use during a contingency or a planned part of a dive, by a rescuer, support diver, or stand-by diver. The handing off of the cylinder allows the receiving diver to maneuver independently of the donor, and the hand-off procedure should not compromise either diver's ability to maintain neutral buoyancy if it is needed for safety. In most cases, it is easier for the receiving diver to adjust buoyancy by adding gas to their buoyancy compensator to compensate for the mass of gas in a cylinder that is neutrally buoyant when empty, assuming correct weighting. This is preferable to having to dump gas from the BC when the cylinder's contents are depleted. Once handed off, the cylinder is usually clipped to the diver's harness for security. Drop cylinders, stage cylinders or stage drop cylinders, are similarly rigged scuba sets which are intended to be taken off and left at the guideline during the early part of a dive, to be collected on the way back.

=== Rebreathers ===
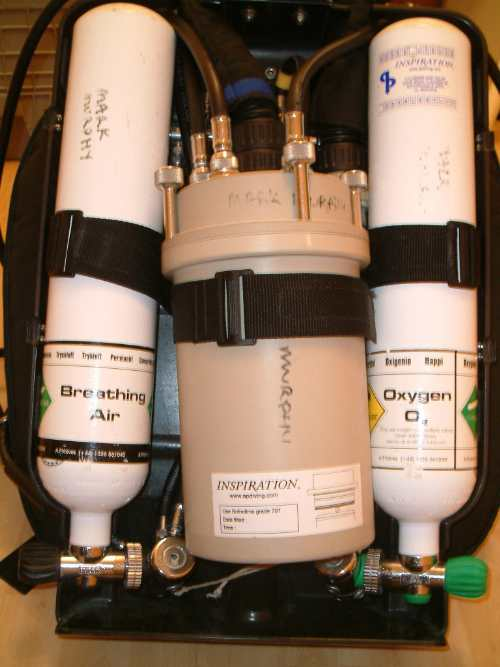
Two 3-litre, 232 bar, DIN valved cylinders inside an Inspiration electronically controlled closed circuit diving rebreather.

A Diving rebreather is an underwater breathing apparatus that absorbs the carbon dioxide of a diver's exhaled breath to permit the rebreathing (recycling) of the substantially unused oxygen content, and unused inert content when present, of each breath. Oxygen is added to replenish the amount metabolised by the diver. Diving cylinders are used in rebreather diving in two roles:

- As part of the rebreather itself. The rebreather must have at least one source of fresh gas stored in a cylinder; many have two and some have more cylinders. Due to the lower gas consumption of rebreathers, these cylinders typically are smaller than those used for equivalent open-circuit dives. Rebreathers may use "on-board" cylinders, fixed to the frame or otherwise an integral part of the unit, or may also be supplied from "off-board" cylinders, which are not directly plumbed into the rebreather, but connected to it by a flexible hose and coupling and usually carried side-slung.
  - oxygen rebreathers have an oxygen cylinder
  - semi-closed circuit rebreathers have at least one cylinder which usually contains nitrox or a helium based gas.
  - closed circuit rebreathers have an oxygen cylinder and a "diluent" cylinder, which contains air, nitrox or a helium based gas.
- Rebreather divers also often carry an external bailout system if the internal diluent cylinder is too small for safe use for bailout for the planned dive. The bailout system is one or more independent breathing gas sources for use if the rebreather should fail:
  - Open-circuit: One or more open circuit scuba sets. The number of open-circuit bailout sets, their capacity and the breathing gases they contain depend on the depth and decompression needs of the dive. So on a deep, technical rebreather dive, the diver will need a bail out "bottom" gas and a bailout "decompression" gas(es). On such a dive, it is usually the capacity of the bailout sets that limits the depth and duration of the dive - not the capacity of the rebreather.
  - Closed-circuit: A second rebreather containing one or more independent diving cylinders for its gas supply. Using another rebreather as a bail-out is possible but uncommon. Although the long duration of rebreathers seems compelling for bail-out, rebreathers are relatively bulky, complex, vulnerable to damage and require more time to start breathing from, than easy-to-use, instantly available, robust and reliable open-circuit equipment.

=== Surface-supplied divers ===
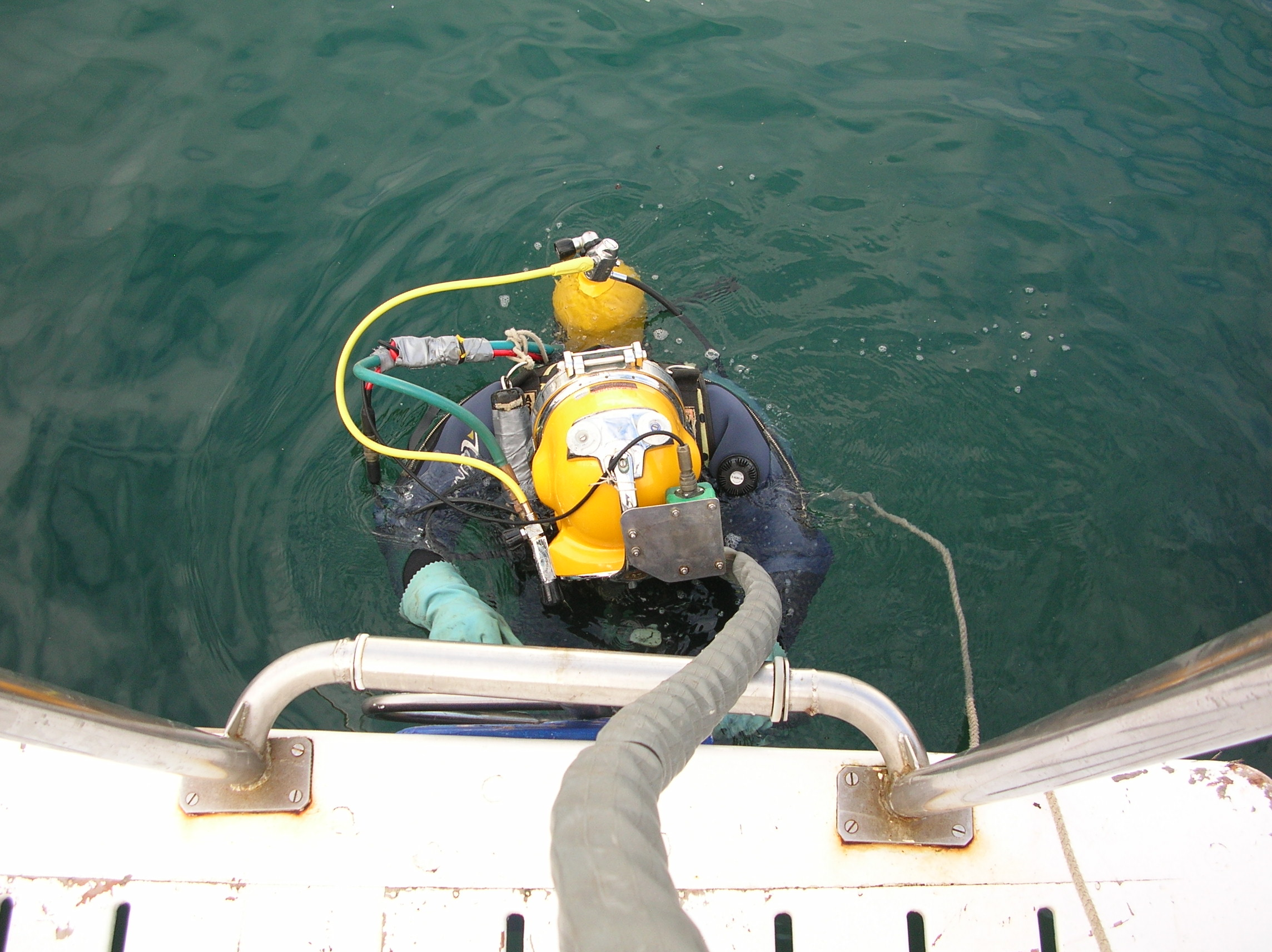
Commercial surface supplied diver wearing a single bailout cylinder plumbed into the helmet bailout block

Surface supplied divers are usually required to carry an emergency gas supply sufficient to allow them to return to a place of safety if the main gas supply fails. The usual configuration is a back-mounted single cylinder supported by the diver's safety harness, with first stage regulator connected by a low-pressure hose to a bailout block, which may be mounted on the side of the helmet or band-mask or on the harness to supply a lightweight full-face mask. Where the capacity of a single cylinder in insufficient, plain manifolded twins or a rebreather may be used. For closed bell bounce and saturation dives the bailout set must be compact enough to allow the diver to pass through the bottom hatch of the bell. This sets a limit on the size of cylinders that can be used.

=== Diving bells ===
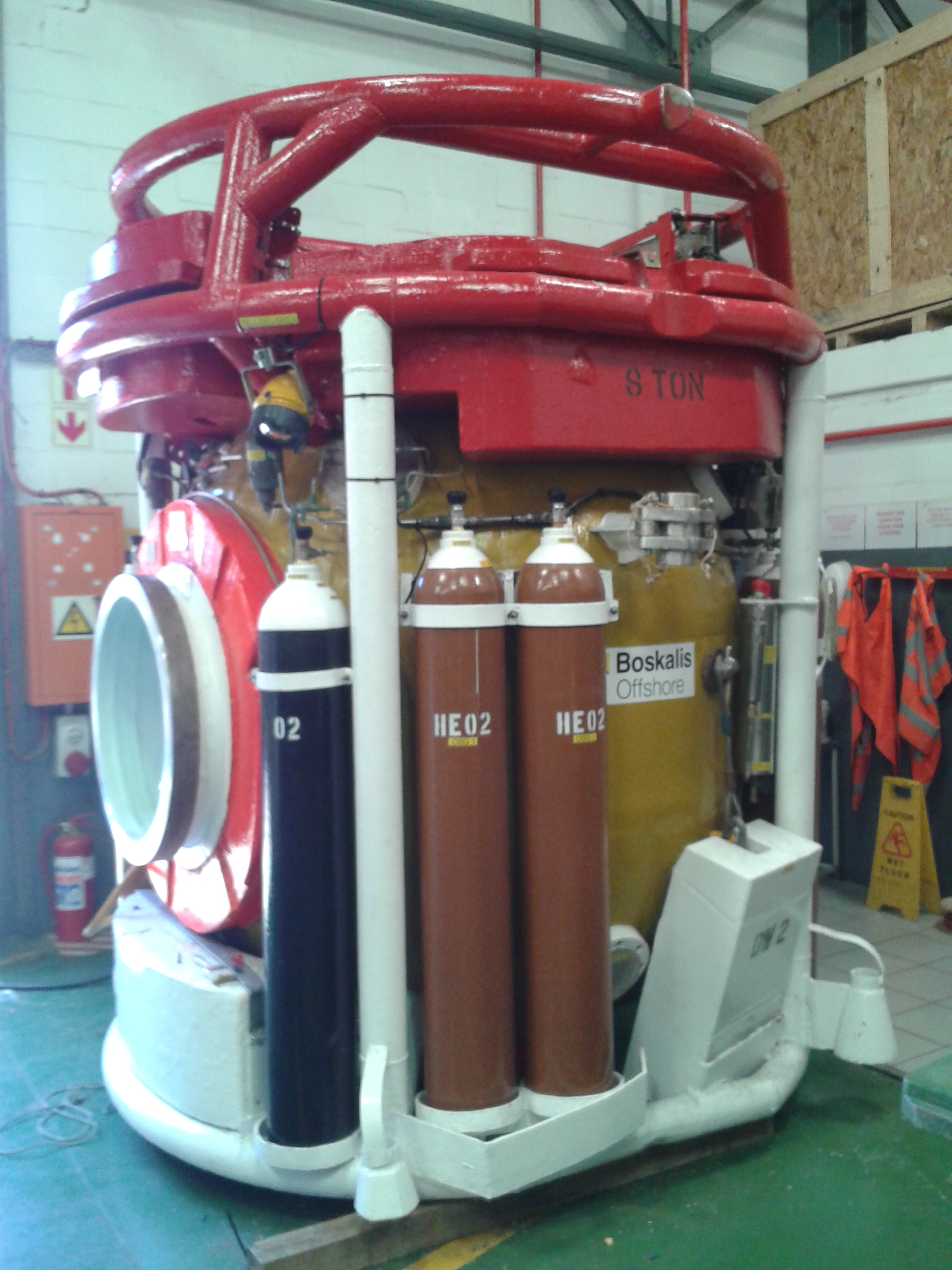
A closed bell used for saturation diving showing emergency gas supply cylinders

Diving bells are required to carry an onboard supply of breathing gas for use in emergencies. The cylinders are mounted externally as there is insufficient space inside. They are fully immersed in the water during bell operations, and may be considered diving cylinders.

=== Suit inflation ===
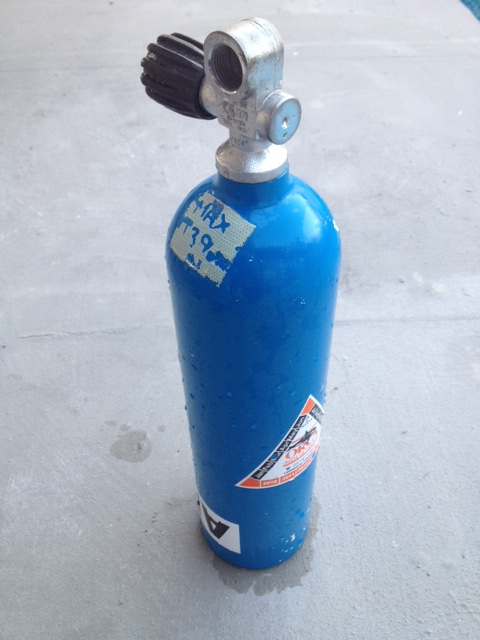
Submersible argon cylinder for dry suit inflation. The blue colour is a legal requirement in South Africa

Dry suit inflation gas may be carried in a small independent cylinder. Sometimes argon is used for superior insulation properties. This must be clearly labelled and may also need to be colour coded to avoid inadvertent use as a breathing gas, which could be fatal as argon is an asphyxiant.

=== Atmospheric pressure diving ===
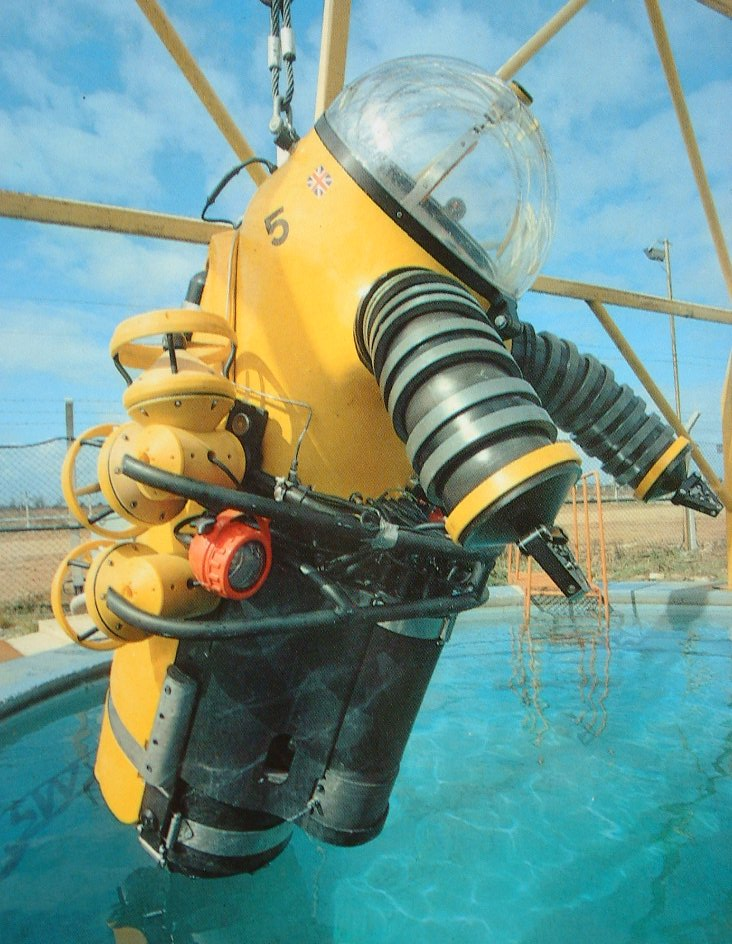
WASP at the OSEL Testing tank Gt Yarmouth, UK

The interior of an ambient pressure diving suit is filled with a breathing gas mixture at approximately 1 bar. At this pressure there is no hazard of acute oxygen toxicity, and the suit is full of normal atmospheric air when the diver enters. It is technically simple to maintain an atmosphere closely approximating surface conditions by simply circulating the gas through a carbon dioxide scrubber and maintaining partial pressure of oxygen at approximately 21% There may be minor pressure variations with temperature changes. On-board oxygen cylinders fixed to the suit are adequate to the task. Feed of oxygen may be provided automatically or manually, and a simple pressure gauge can be used to monitor the internal pressure. Assuming an oxygen supply for an 8-hour mission and 72 hour emergency reserve, a total of approximately 220 cubic feet is sufficient.

=== Other uses in diving operations ===
Scuba divers may also use a small independent cylinder for buoyancy compensator inflation, decompression buoy inflation, or lifting bag inflation. The cylinders used for inflating buoyancy compensators and decompression buoys are small and mounted on the unit, and are generally operated by manually controlling the gas flow with the cylinder valve. For a lifting bag the cylinder may be carried by the diver or mounted on the bag itself, and is also usually manually operated.

Divers also use gas cylinders above water for storage of oxygen for first aid treatment of diving disorders and as part of storage "banks" for diving air compressor stations, gas blending, surface-supplied breathing gas and gas supplies for decompression chambers and saturation systems. Similar cylinders are also used for many purposes not connected to diving. For these applications they are not diving cylinders and may not be subject to the same regulatory requirements as cylinders used underwater.

== Configurations ==
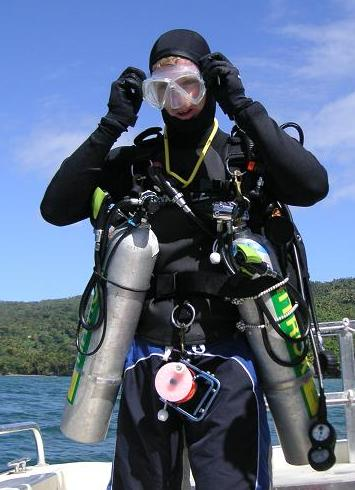
Technical diver with decompression gases in side mounted stage cylinders.

The cylinder configurations are the way the cylinders are carried by the diver, and where relevant, interconnected. Cylinder configuration affects gas carrying capacity, gas redundancy, ergonomics, balance, trim, and maneuverability in confined spaces.

=== Single cylinder back mount ===
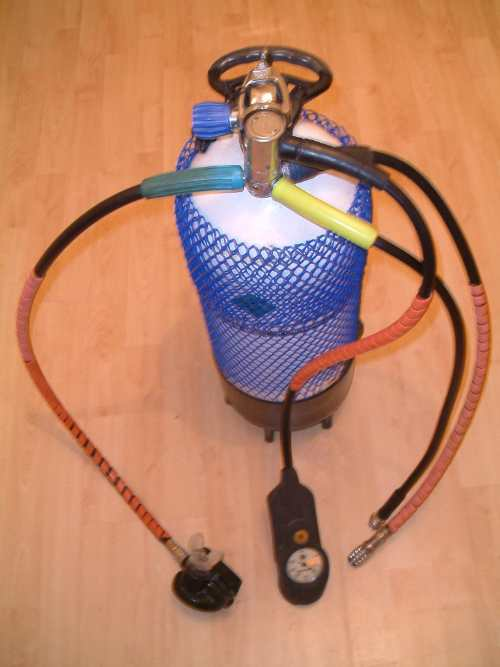
15-litre, 232 bar, A-clamp single cylinder open circuit scuba set

A single cylinder configuration is usually a single large cylinder, usually back-mounted, with one first-stage regulator, and usually two second-stage regulators. This configuration is simple and cheap but it has only a single breathing gas supply and no redundancy in case of failure. If the cylinder or first-stage regulator fails, the diver is totally out of air and faces a life-threatening emergency. Recreational diver training agencies train divers to rely on a buddy to assist them in this situation. The skill of gas sharing is trained on most entry level scuba courses. This equipment configuration, although common with entry-level divers and used for most sport diving, is not recommended by training agencies for any dive where decompression stops are needed, or where there is an overhead environment (wreck diving, cave diving, or ice diving) as it provides no functional redundancy.

A single cylinder with dual regulators consists of a single large back-mounted cylinder, with two first-stage regulators, each with a second-stage regulator. This system is mostly used for diving where cold water makes the risk of regulator freezing high and functional regulator redundancy is required. It is common in continental Europe, especially Germany. The advantage is that a regulator failure can be solved underwater to bring the dive to a controlled conclusion without buddy breathing or gas sharing. However, it can be difficult for some divers to reach the valves, so there may be some reliance on the dive buddy to help close the valve of the free-flowing regulator quickly.

=== Back mount with pony cylinder ===
This configuration uses a larger, back-mounted main cylinder along with a smaller independent cylinder, often called a "pony" or "bailout cylinder". The diver has two independent systems, but the total 'breathing system' is now heavier, and more expensive to buy and maintain.

The pony is typically a 2- to 5-litre cylinder. Its capacity determines the depth of dive and decompression duration for which it provides protection. Ponies may be fixed to the diver's buoyancy compensator (BC) or main cylinder behind the diver's back, or can be clipped to the harness at the diver's side or chest or carried as a sling cylinder. Ponies provide an accepted and reliable emergency gas supply but require that the diver is trained to use them.

Another type of small independent air source is a hand-held cylinder filled with about 85 litres (3.0 ft^{3}) of free air with a diving regulator directly attached, such as the Spare Air. This source provides only a few breaths of gas at depth and is most suitable as a shallow-water bailout.

=== Independent twins ===
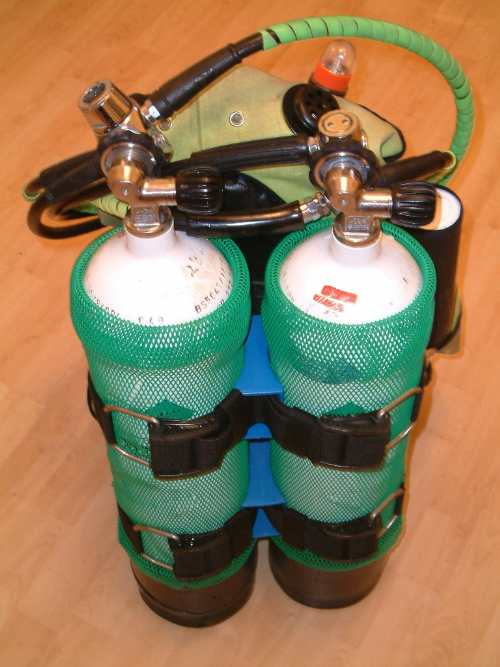
7-litre, 232 bar, DIN pillar valve independent twin set. The left cylinder shows manufacturer markings. The right cylinder shows test stamps

Independent twin sets or independent doubles consist of two independent cylinders each with a regulator, and each with a submersible pressure gauge. This system is heavier, more expensive to buy and maintain and more expensive to fill than a single cylinder set. The diver must swap demand valves during the dive to preserve a sufficient reserve of gas in each cylinder, in that each must at all times contain enough gas to make a safe ascent. If this is not done, a cylinder failure could leave the diver with an inadequate reserve. Independent twin sets only work well with air-integrated dive computers if they can monitor two or more cylinders. The task loading of switching regulators periodically to ensure both cylinders are evenly used may be offset by the redundancy of two entirely separate breathing gas supplies. The cylinders may be mounted as a twin set on the diver's back, or alternatively can be carried in a sidemount configuration where penetration of wrecks or caves requires it, and where the cylinder valves are in easy reach.

=== Plain manifolded twins ===
Plain manifolded twin sets, or manifolded doubles with a single regulator, consist of two back-mounted cylinders with their pillar valves connected by a manifold but only one regulator is attached to the manifold. This makes it relatively simple and cheap but means there is no redundant functionality to the breathing system, only a double gas supply. This arrangement was fairly common in the early days of scuba when low-pressure cylinders were manifolded to provide a larger air supply than was possible from the available single cylinders. It is still in use for large capacity bailout sets for deep commercial diving.

=== Isolation manifolded twins ===
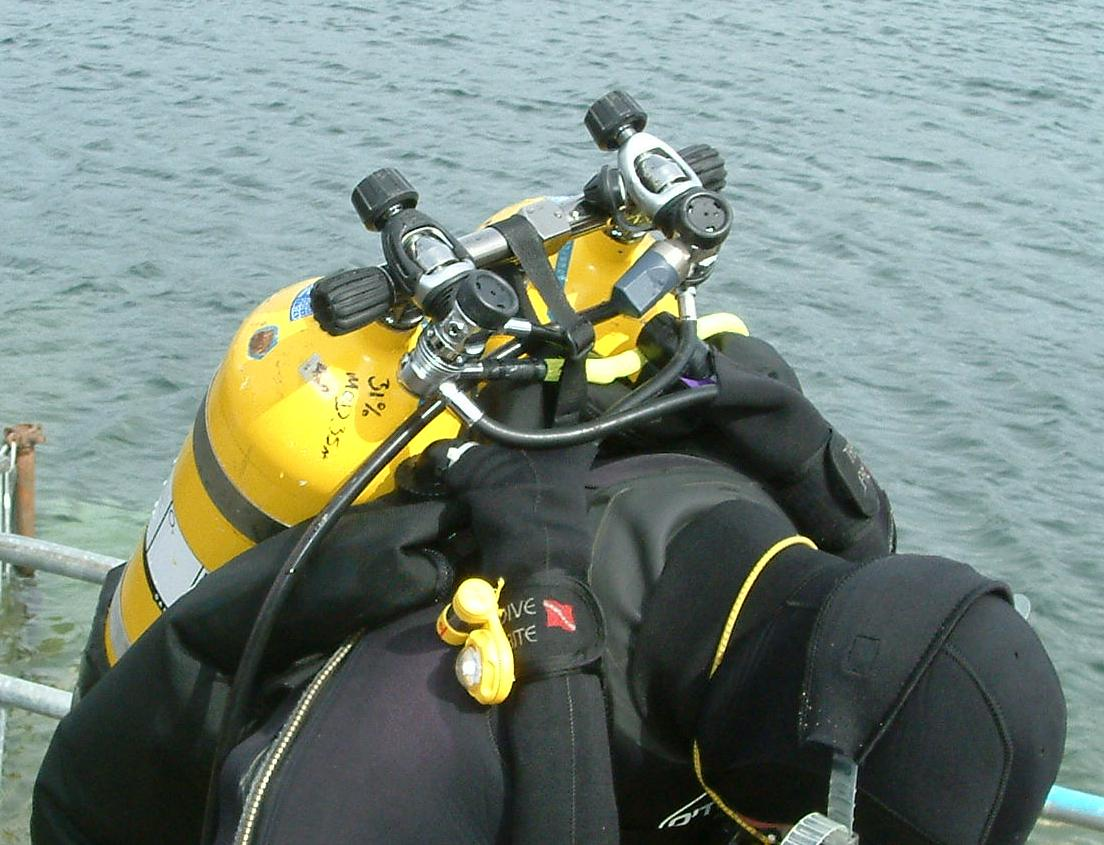
Isolation manifolded twin 12-litre, 232-bar scuba set with two A-clamp pillar valves and two regulators

Isolation manifolded twin sets or manifolded doubles with two regulators, consist of two back-mounted cylinders with their pillar valves connected by a manifold, with a valve in the manifold that can be closed to isolate the two pillar valves. In the event of a problem with one cylinder the diver may close the isolation valve to preserve gas in the cylinder which has not failed. The advantages of this configuration include: a larger gas supply than from a single cylinder; automatic balancing of the gas supply between the two cylinders; thus, no requirement to constantly change regulators underwater during the dive; and in most failure situations, the diver may close a valve to a failed regulator or isolate a cylinder and may retain access to all the remaining gas in both the tanks. The disadvantages are that the manifold is another potential point of failure, and there is a danger of losing all gas from both cylinders if the isolation valve cannot be closed when a problem occurs. This configuration of cylinders is often used in technical diving.

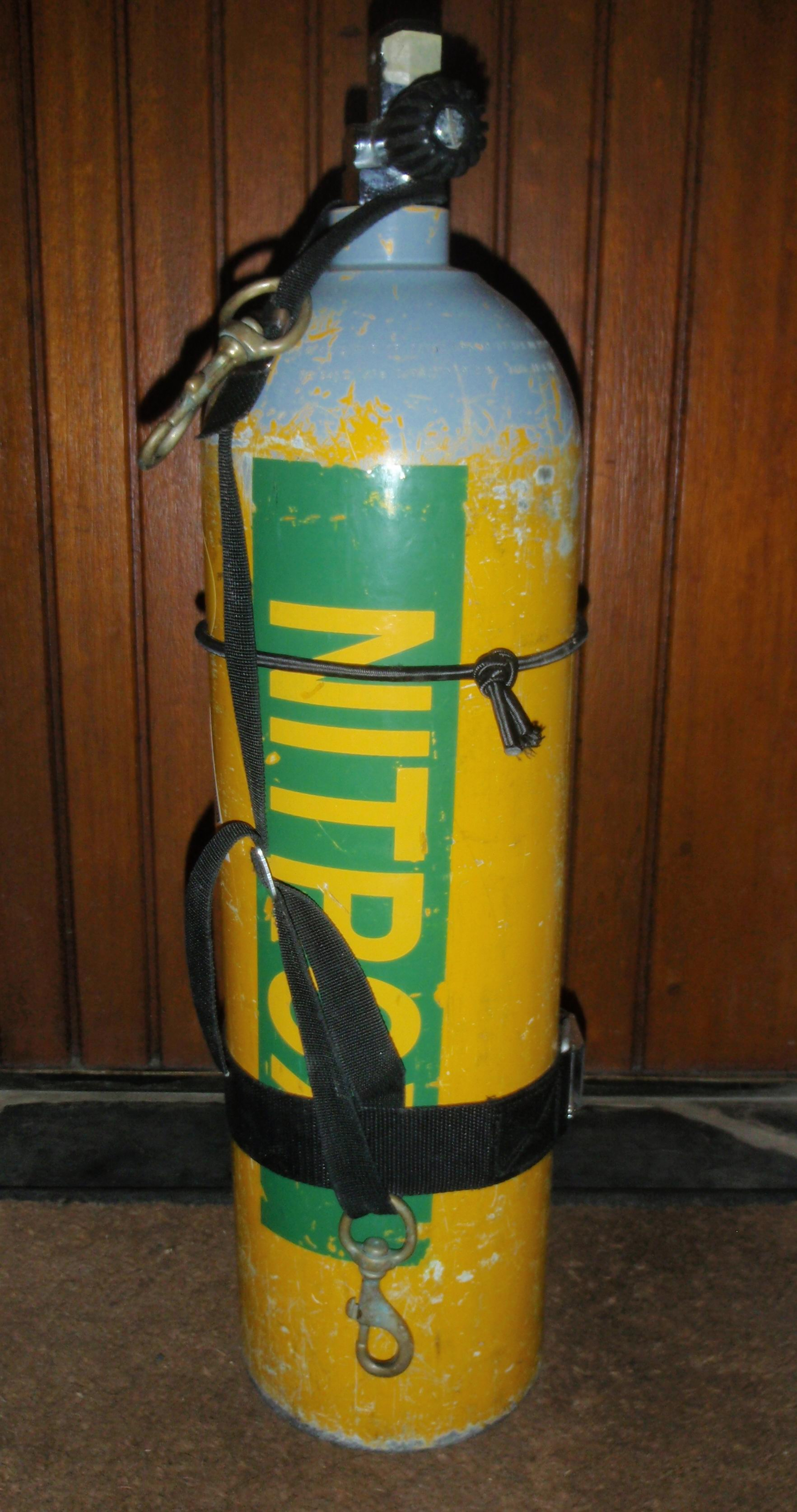
Long 9.2-litre aluminium cylinder rigged for sling mounting

=== Sling cylinders ===
Sling cylinders are a configuration of independent cylinders used for technical diving and solo diving. They are independent cylinders with their own regulators and are carried clipped to the harness at the side of the diver at the shoulder and hip. Their purpose may be to carry stage, travel, decompression, or bailout gas, or gas for inflating a lift bag, while the back-mounted cylinder(s) usually carry bottom gas which may also be used for other stages of the dive.

=== Sidemount cylinders ===
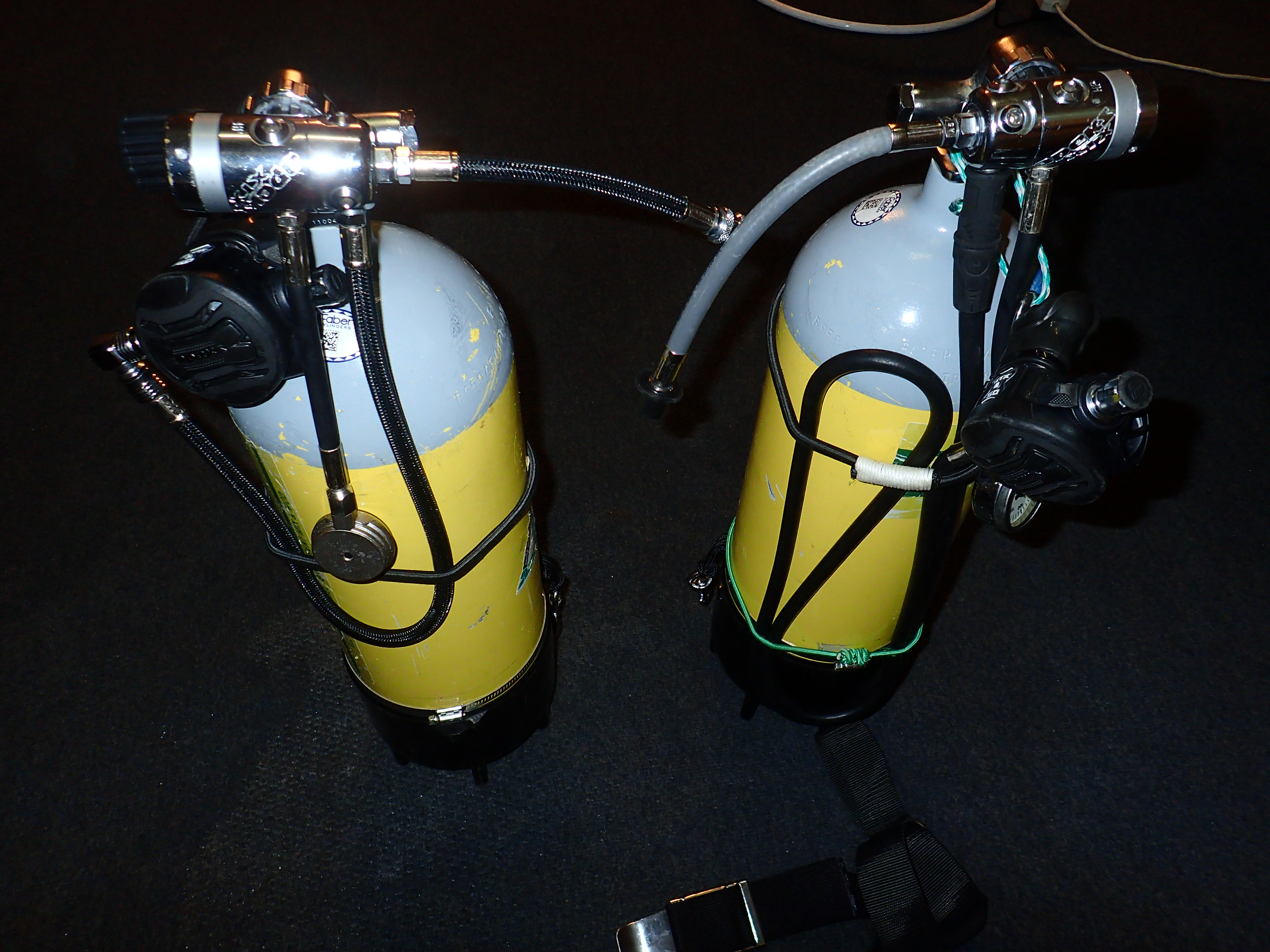
Sidemount cylinder set with regulators fitted.

Sidemount cylinders are cylinders clipped to the harness at the diver's sides in a specific way, (Note: The top of the cylinder is held close to the diver by a bungee) usually when the diver does not carry back-mount cylinders. Skilled sidemount divers may carry as many as three cylinders on each side. This configuration was developed for access through tight restrictions in caves. Side mounting is primarily used for technical diving, but is also sometimes used for basic recreational diving, when a single cylinder may be carried, complete with secondary second stage (octopus) regulator, in a configuration sometimes referred to as monkey diving.

== Gas calculations ==
It is necessary to know the approximate length of time that a diver can breathe from a given cylinder so that a safe dive profile can be planned.

There are two parts to this problem: The capacity of the cylinder and the consumption by the diver.

=== Capacity to store gas ===
Two features of the cylinder determine its gas carrying capacity:

- internal volume (water capacity) of the cylinder,
- cylinder working pressure for nominal capacity, or the actual measured pressure, as the cylinder may not be full.

At the pressures which apply to most diving cylinders, the ideal gas equation is sufficiently accurate in almost all cases, as the variables that apply to gas consumption generally overwhelm the error in the ideal gas assumption.

To calculate the quantity of gas:

Volume of gas at atmospheric pressure = (cylinder volume) x (cylinder pressure) / (atmospheric pressure)

In those parts of the world using the metric system the calculation is relatively simple as atmospheric pressure may be approximated as 1 bar.

In the US the capacity of a diving cylinder is specified directly in cubic feet of free air at the nominal working pressure, as the calculation from internal volume and working pressure is relatively tedious in imperial units.

Up to about 200 bar the ideal gas law remains useful and the relationship between the pressure, size of the cylinder and gas contained in the cylinder is approximately linear. At higher pressures this linearity no longer applies, and there is proportionally less gas in the cylinder. Equations have been proposed which give more accurate solutions at high pressure, including the Van der Waals equation. Compressibility at higher pressures also varies between gases and mixtures of gases.

=== Diver gas consumption ===
Diver gas consumption is determined by three main factors:

gas consumed = surface air consumption × time at depth × ambient pressure at depth, in a consistent system of units.

Surface air consumption is the rate at which the diver consumes gas, specified as surface air consumption (SAC) or respiratory minute volume (RMV) of the diver. This can vary considerably depending on the work rate, fitness and state of mind of the diver. RMV is mainly controlled by blood CO_{2} levels, and is usually independent of oxygen partial pressures, so does not change much with depth, though it is limited by work of breathing which is affected by gas density. The very large range of possible rates of gas consumption results in a significant uncertainty of how long the supply will last, and a conservative approach is required for safety where an immediate access to an alternative breathing gas source is not possible. Scuba divers are expected to monitor the remaining gas pressure sufficiently often that they are aware of how much is still available at all times during a dive.

Time at each depth is usually approximated as time at each depth range.

Ambient pressure is determined by the depth of the dive, and equal to the sum of surface atmospheric pressure and hydrostatic pressure of the water above the diver. the breathing gas is delivered at ambient pressure, and the amount of gas used is proportional to the pressure. The mass consumption of breathing gas by the diver is similarly affected.

=== Breathing gas endurance ===
The amount of time that a diver can breathe from a cylinder is also known as air or gas endurance.

Maximum endurance (T) for a given depth can be calculated as

T = available air / rate of consumption

which, using the ideal gas law, is

T = (available cylinder pressure × cylinder volume) / (rate of air consumption at surface) × (ambient pressure)

Ambient pressure is the surrounding water pressure at a given depth and is made up of the sum of the hydrostatic pressure and the air pressure at the surface.

Ambient pressure is also deducted from cylinder pressure, as the gas can only be used until the cylinder pressure balances ambient pressure. This formula neglects the cracking pressure required to open both first and second stages of the regulator, and pressure drop due to flow restrictions in the regulator, both of which are variable depending on the design and adjustment of the regulator, and flow rate, which depends on the breathing pattern of the diver and the gas in use. These factors are not easily estimated, so the calculated value for breathing duration will be more than the real value.

In normal diving usage, a reserve is always factored in. The reserve is a proportion of the cylinder pressure which a diver will not plan to use other than in an emergency. The reserve may be a quarter or a third of the cylinder pressure or it may be a fixed pressure, common examples are 50 bar and 500 psi. The formula is then modified to give the usable breathing duration.

=== Reserves ===
It is strongly recommended by diver training organisations and codes of practice that a portion of the usable gas be held aside as a safety reserve. The reserve is intended to provide gas for longer-than-planned decompression stops or to provide time to resolve underwater emergencies.

The size of the reserve depends upon the risks involved during the dive. A deep or decompression dive warrants a greater reserve than a shallow or a no-stop dive. In recreational diving for example, it is recommended that the diver plans to surface with a reserve remaining in the cylinder of 500 psi, 50 bar or 25% of the initial capacity, depending on the teaching of the diver training organisation. This is because recreational divers practicing within no-decompression limits can normally make a direct ascent in an emergency. On technical dives where a direct ascent is either impossible (due to overhead obstructions) or dangerous (due to the requirement to make decompression stops), divers plan larger margins of safety. The simplest method uses the rule of thirds: one third of the gas supply is planned for the outward journey, one third is for the return journey and one third is a safety reserve.

Some training agencies teach the concept of minimum gas, rock bottom gas management or critical pressures which allows a diver to calculate an acceptable reserve to get two divers to the surface in an emergency from any point in the planned dive profile.

Professional divers may be required by legislation or industry codes of practice to carry sufficient reserve gas to enable them to reach a place of safety, such as the surface, or a diving bell, based on the planned dive profile. This reserve gas is usually required to be carried as an independent emergency gas supply (EGS), also known as a bailout cylinder, set or bottle. This usually also applies to professional divers using surface-supplied diving equipment.

=== Mass of gas consumed ===
The mass of gas that may be consumed during a scuba dive is a key factor in the calculation to achieve neutrally buoyant by ensuring that the diver is sufficiently weighted and that the buoyancy compensator has sufficient volume. The density of air at sea level and 15 °C is approximately 1.225 kg/m^{3}. Most full-sized diving cylinders used for open circuit scuba hold more than 2 kilograms (4.4 lb) of air when full, and as the air is used, the buoyancy of the cylinder increases by the weight removed. (Note: The mass of air in a 10 L cylinder at 200 bar is 2.45 kg) The decrease in external volume of the cylinder due to reduction of internal pressure is relatively small, and can be ignored for practical purposes. (Note: A typical example of an Al80 tested to 5000psi expanded by 73.6cc so expansion would be 3/5 of that (44.16 cc) at 3000 psi. That is a reduction of volume of 44 cc if the entire gas contents were used during a dive, for a buoyancy loss of 44 g, which is small compared to the mass loss of about 2.8 kg (2800 g) of air (roughly 1.6%), and can be disregarded as a first approximation.)

The loss of the weight of the gas taken from the cylinder makes the cylinder and diver more buoyant. This can be a problem if the diver is unable to remain neutrally buoyant towards the end of the dive because most of the gas has been breathed from the cylinder. The buoyancy change due to gas usage from back-mounted cylinders is easily compensated by carrying sufficient diving weights to provide neutral buoyancy with empty cylinders at the end of a dive, and using the buoyancy compensator to neutralise the excess weight until the gas has been used.

== Filling ==
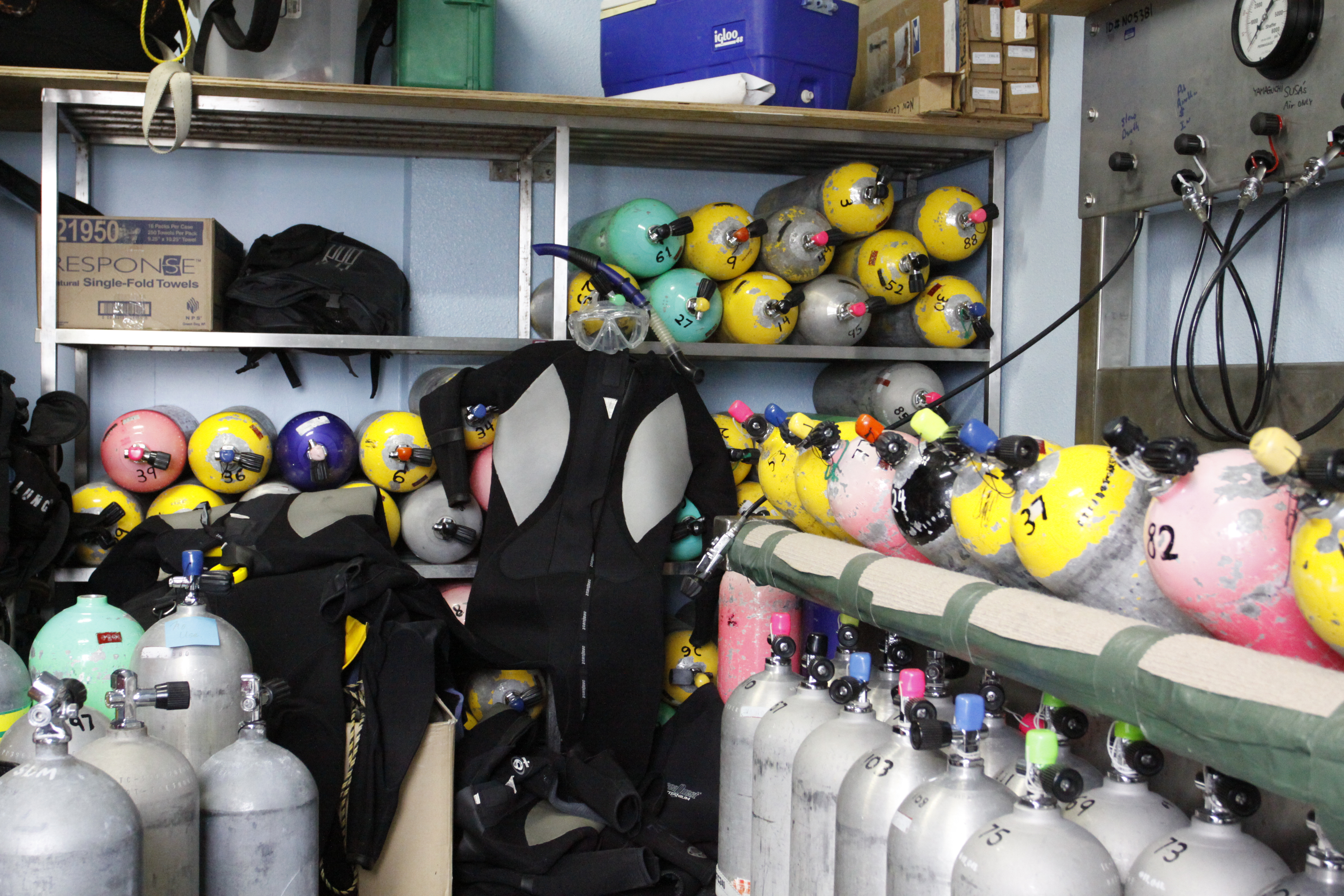
Dive shop scuba filling station

Diving cylinders are filled by attaching a high-pressure gas supply to the cylinder valve, opening the valve and allowing gas to flow into the cylinder until the desired pressure is reached, then closing the valves, venting the connection and disconnecting it. This process involves a risk of the cylinder or the filling equipment failing under pressure, both of which are hazardous to the operator, so procedures to control these risks are generally followed. Rate of filling must be limited to avoid excessive heating, the temperature of cylinder and contents must remain below the maximum working temperature specified by the applicable standard.

=== Pre-fill inspection ===
Before filling a cylinder the filling operator may be required by regulations, code of practice, or operations manual, to inspect the cylinder and valve for any obvious external defects or damage, and to reject for filling any cylinder that does not comply with the standards. It may also be required to record cylinder details in the filling log.

=== Filling from a compressor ===
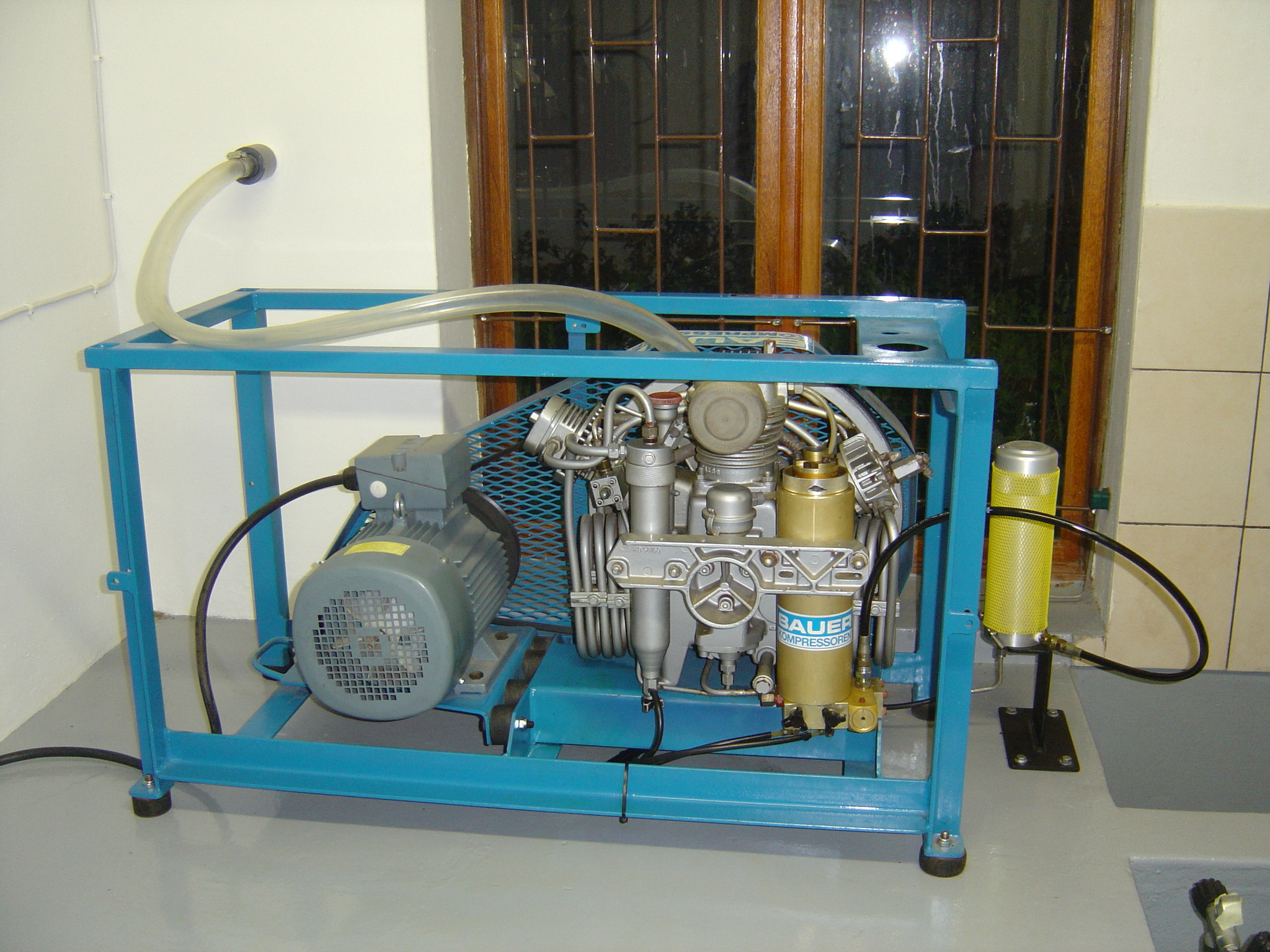
Small stationary HP compressor installation

Breathing air supply can come directly from a high-pressure breathing air compressor, from a high-pressure storage system, or from a combined storage system with compressor. A large-volume bank of high-pressure storage cylinders allows faster charging or simultaneous charging of multiple cylinders.

The quality of compressed breathing air for diving is usually specified by national or organisational standards, and the steps generally taken to assure the air quality include:

- use of a compressor rated for breathing air,
- use of compressor lubricants rated for breathing air,
- filtration of intake air to remove particulate contamination,
- positioning of the compressor air intake in clean air clear of known sources of contaminants such as internal combustion exhaust fumes, sewer vents etc.
- removal of condensate from the compressed air by water separators. This may be done between stages on the compressor as well as after compression.
- filtration after compression to remove remaining water, oil, and other contaminants using specialized filter media such as desiccants, molecular sieve or activated carbon. Traces of carbon monoxide may be catalyzed to carbon dioxide by Hopcalite.
- periodical air quality tests,
- scheduled filter changes and maintenance of the compressor.

=== Filling from high-pressure storage ===
Cylinders may also be filled directly from high-pressure storage systems by decanting, with or without pressure boosting to reach the desired charging pressure. Cascade filling may be used for efficiency when multiple storage cylinders are available. High-pressure storage is commonly used when blending nitrox, heliox and trimix diving gases, and for oxygen for rebreathers and decompression gas.

Nitrox and trimix blending may include decanting the oxygen and/or helium, and topping up with air to working pressure using a compressor, after which the gas mixture must be analysed and the cylinder labeled with the gas composition.

=== Temperature change during filling ===
Compression of gas causes a temperature rise proportional to the pressure increase. Ambient air is typically compressed in stages, and the gas temperature rises during each stage. Intercoolers and water cooling heat exchangers can remove much of this heat between stages.

Charging an empty dive cylinder also causes a temperature rise as the gas inside the cylinder is compressed by the inflow of higher-pressure gas. This rise may initially be tempered because compressed gas from a storage bank at room temperature cools as its pressure decreases. At first, the empty cylinder is therefore charged with cold gas, but as filling continues the gas temperature increases to above ambient once the cylinder reaches working pressure.

Excess heat can be removed by immersion of the cylinder in a cold water bath while filling, but this immersion can also increase the risk of water contaminating the valve orifice of a completely depressurized tank and being blown into the cylinder during filling. Cylinders may also be filled without water-bath cooling, and may be charged to above the nominal working pressure to the developed pressure appropriate to the temperature when filled. As the gas cools to ambient temperature, the pressure decreases, and will reach rated charging pressure at the rated temperature.

=== Filling safety ===
Legal constraints on filling scuba cylinders vary by jurisdiction. Two aspects must be considered: the safety of the person filling the cylinder, which falls under occupational safety and mainly concerns the condition of the cylinder and filling equipment; and the safety of the diver who will breathe the gas, which depends on the quality of the gas as filled. There is also the matter of delivering the service and product in accordance with the contract.

In South Africa, cylinders may be filled for commercial purposes by a person who is competent in the use of the filling equipment, is familiar with the relevant sections of the applicable standards and regulations, and has written permission from the cylinder's owner to perform the filling. The cylinder must be in test, that is, up to date with its hydrostatic test and internal visual inspection, and suitable for the gas to be filled. It may not be filled above the developed pressure for the temperature reached when it is filled. An external inspection of the cylinder must be made, and specified details of the cylinder and fill must be recorded. If the fill is of a gas other than air, the analysis of the completed fill must be recorded by the filler and signed by the customer. If the residual pressure in a cylinder presented for filling does not produce a reasonably strong outflow of gas from the valve when opened the filler may refuse to fill the cylinder unless an acceptable reason is given for it being empty, as there is no way for the filler to check if it has been contaminated. In South Africa, the fill is required by the trade descriptions act to be between 95% and 100% of the advertised or contractually agreed charging pressure, taking into account the developed pressure, and the customer must witness a gas analysis for custom blends.

=== Gas contamination ===
Contaminated breathing gas at depth can be fatal. Concentrations which are acceptable at the surface ambient pressure will be increased by the pressure of depth and may then exceed acceptable or tolerable limits. Common contaminants are: carbon monoxide – a by-product of combustion, carbon dioxide – a product of metabolism, and oil and lubricants from the compressor.

Keeping the cylinder slightly pressurized at all times during storage and transportation reduces the possibility of inadvertently contaminating the inside of the cylinder with corrosive agents, such as sea water, or toxic material, such as oils, poisonous gases, fungi or bacteria. A normal dive will end with some pressure remaining in the cylinder. If an emergency ascent has been made due to an out-of-gas incident, the cylinder will normally still contain some pressure. Unless the cylinder was submerged deeper than the depth at which the last gas was used, it is not possible for water to enter during the dive.

Contamination by water during filling can occur for two reasons. First, inadequate filtration and drying of the compressed air can introduce small amounts of fresh water condensate or an emulsion of water and compressor lubricant. Second, failing to clear the cylinder valve orifice of water that may have dripped from wet dive gear can allow contamination by fresh or seawater. Both cause corrosion, but seawater contamination can cause a cylinder to corrode so rapidly to the extent that it becomes unsafe or condemned after a relatively short period. This problem is exacerbated in hot climates, where chemical reactions occur faster, and is more prevalent where filling staff are poorly trained or overworked.

=== Gas purity and testing ===
Diving cylinders should only be filled with suitably filtered air from diving air compressors or with other breathing gases using gas blending or decanting techniques. In some jurisdictions, suppliers of breathing gases are required by legislation to periodically test the quality of compressed air produced by their equipment and to display the test results for public information. The standards for compressed gas produced for industrial purposes may allow some contaminants at levels unsafe for breathing, and their use in breathing gas mixtures at high pressure could be harmful or fatal.

=== Handling of specialty gases ===
Special precautions need to be taken with gases other than air:

- oxygen in high concentrations is a major cause of fire and rust.
- oxygen should be very carefully transferred from one cylinder to another and only ever stored in containers that are cleaned and labeled for oxygen service.
- gas mixtures containing proportions of oxygen other than 21% could be extremely dangerous to divers who are unaware of the proportion of oxygen in them. All cylinders should be labeled with their composition.
- cylinders containing a high oxygen content must be cleaned for the use of oxygen and their valves lubricated only with oxygen service grease to reduce the chance of combustion.

Specialty mixed-gas charging will almost always involve supply cylinders of high-purity gas sourced from an industrial gas supplier. Oxygen and helium should be stored, mixed and compressed in well-ventilated spaces - oxygen, because any leaks pose a fire hazard, and helium, because it is an asphyxiant. Neither gas can be detected by the unaided human senses.

== Safety and standards ==
Before any cylinder is filled, the inspection and testing dates should be verified, and a visual examination for external damage and corrosion should be performed. In some jurisdictions, these steps are required by law. Inspection dates can be checked by looking at the visual inspection label, and the hydrostatic test date is stamped on the shoulder of the cylinder.

Before use the user should verify the contents of the cylinder and check the function of the cylinder valve. This is usually done with a regulator connected to control the flow. Pressure and gas mixture are critical information for the diver, and the valve should open freely without sticking or leaking from the spindle seals. Failure to recognize that the cylinder valve was not opened or that a cylinder was empty has been observed in divers conducting a pre-dive check. Breathing gas bled from a cylinder may be checked for smell. If the gas does not smell right it should not be used. Breathing gas should be almost free of smell, though a very slight aroma of the compressor lubricant is fairly common. No smell of combustion products or volatile hydrocarbons should be discernible.

Full cylinders should not be exposed to temperatures above 65 °C and cylinders should not be filled to pressures greater than the developed pressure appropriate to the certified working pressure of the cylinder.

Cylinders should be clearly labelled with their current contents. A generic "Nitrox", "Heliox", or "Trimix" label will alert the user that the contents may not be air, and must be analysed before use. A nitrox label requires analysis of the oxygen fraction and assumes the remainder is nitrogen, while a trimix label requires analysis of both oxygen and helium fractions for full information for decompression. In some parts of the world a label is required specifically indicating that the contents are air, and in other places a colour code without additional labels indicates by default that the contents are air. In other places the default assumption is that the contents of any cylinder with a scuba cylinder valve are air, regardless of cylinder colour, unless specifically labelled to indicate other contents.

In a fire, the pressure in a gas cylinder rises in direct proportion to its absolute temperature. If the internal pressure exceeds the mechanical limitations of the cylinder and there are no means to safely vent the pressurized gas to the atmosphere, the vessel will fail mechanically.

=== Manufacturing standards ===
High pressure gas storage cylinders are manufactured to a number of national and international standards. National standards may refer to other national standards as accepted alternatives. When a standard is superseded, cylinders manufactured to previously accepted standards usually remain legal for continued use provided that they continue to pass inspections and testing as currently required.

=== Periodic inspection and testing ===
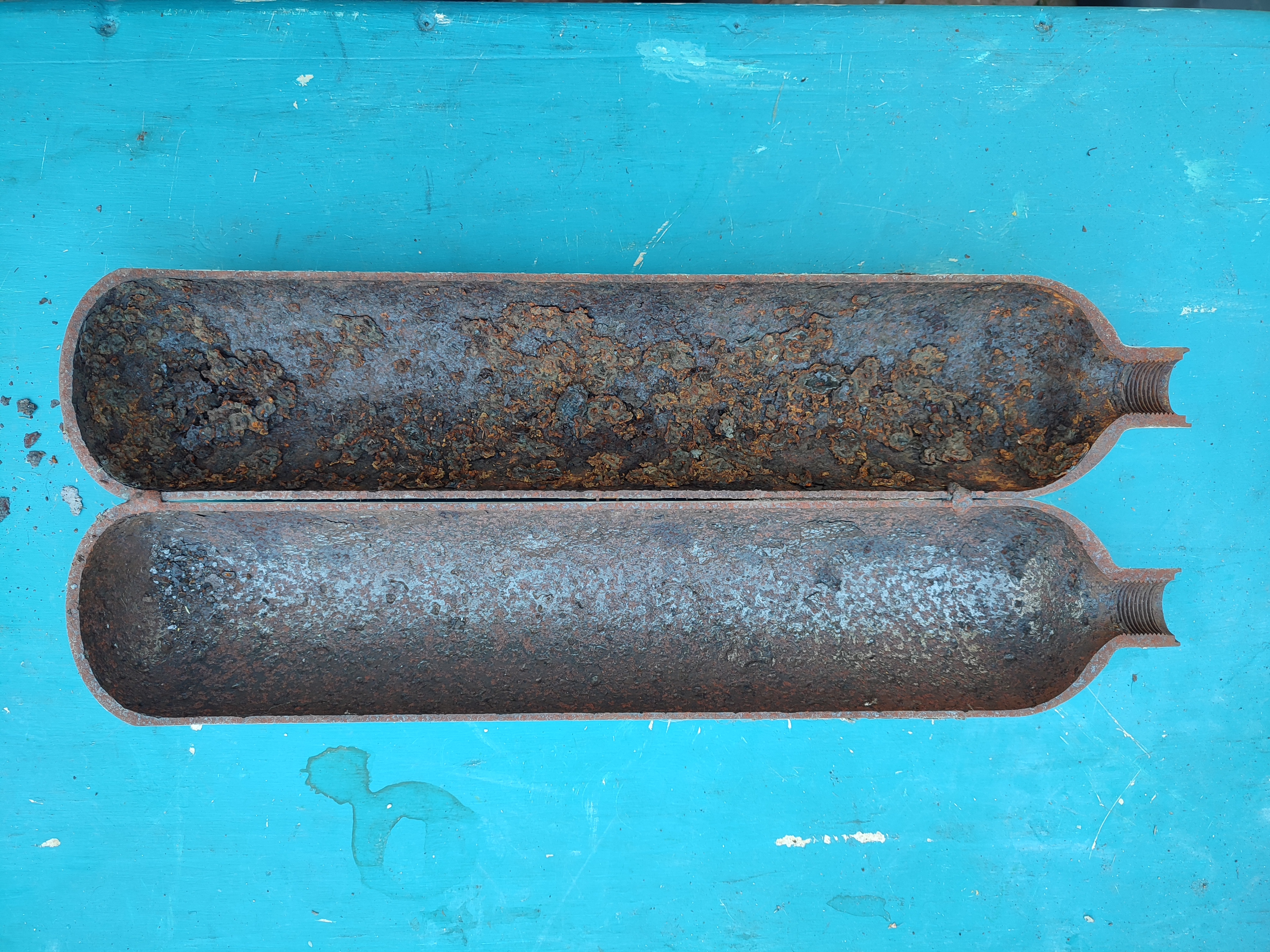
Pitted and corroded scuba cylinder interior

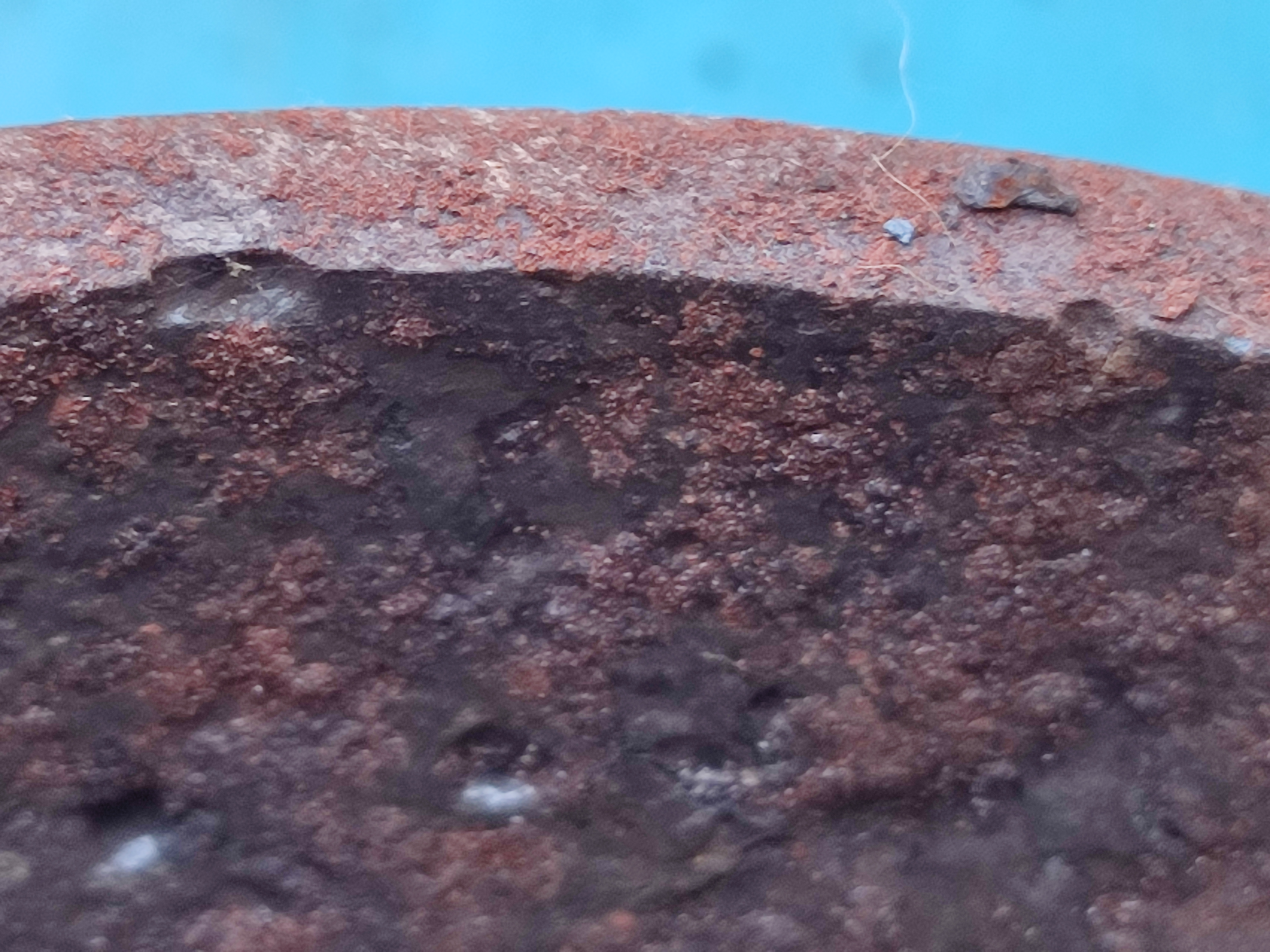
Pitted and corroded scuba cylinder detail

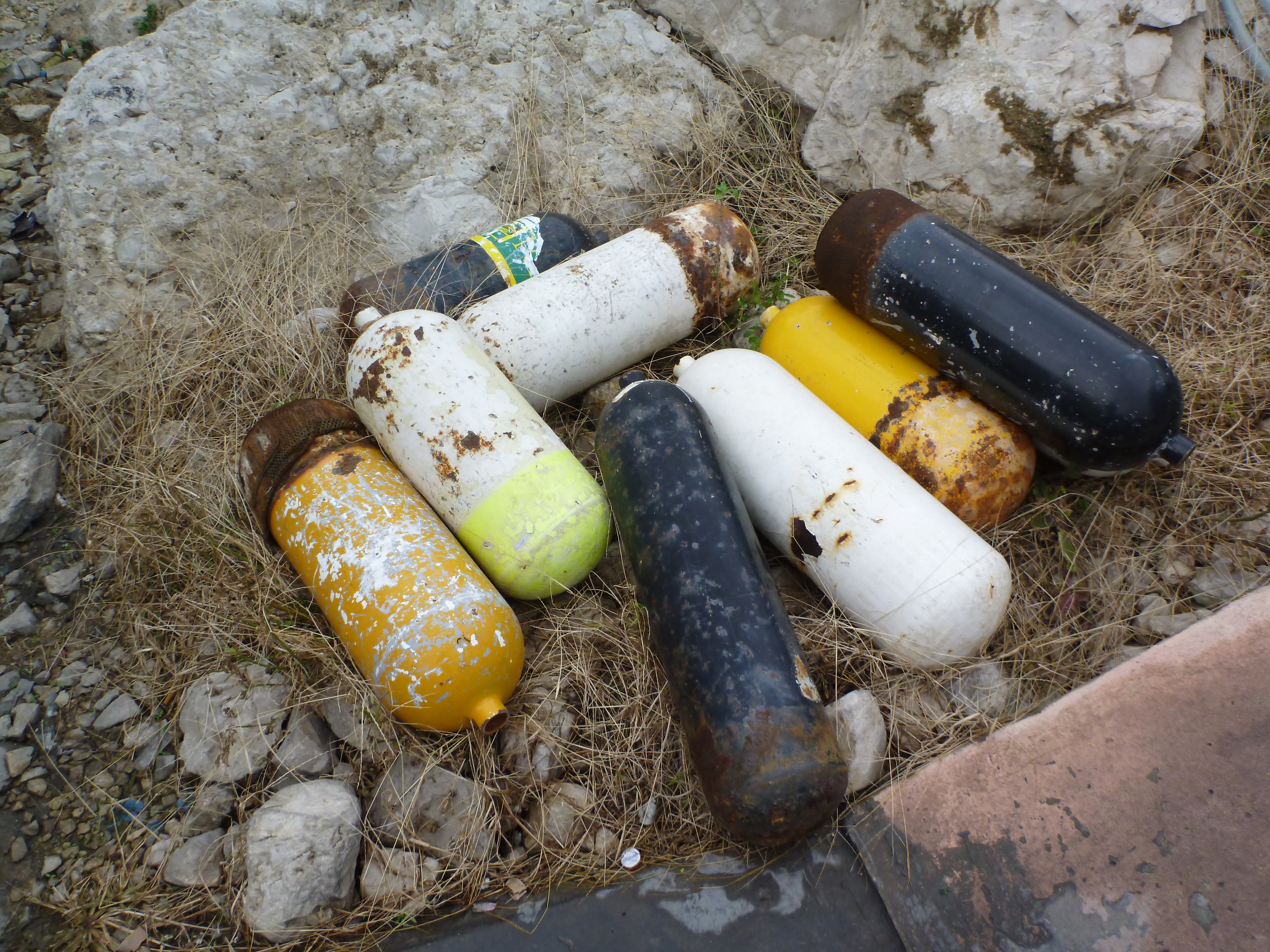
Condemned diving cylinders set aside for metal recycling

Most countries require diving cylinders to be checked on a regular basis. This usually consists of an internal visual inspection and a hydrostatic test. The inspection and testing requirements for scuba cylinders may be very different from the requirements for other compressed gas containers due to the more corrosive environment.

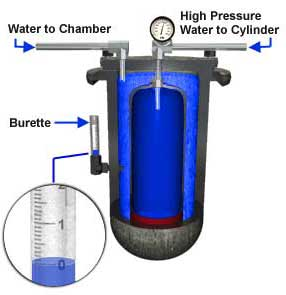
Water jacket hydrostatic test diagram

A hydrostatic test involves pressurising the cylinder to its test pressure (usually 5/3 or 3/2 of the working pressure) and measuring its volume before and after the test. A permanent increase in volume above the tolerated level means the cylinder fails the test and must be permanently removed from service.

An inspection includes external and internal inspection for damage, corrosion, and correct colour and markings. The failure criteria vary according to the published standards of the relevant authority, but may include inspection for bulges, overheating, dents, gouges, electrical arc scars, pitting, line corrosion, general corrosion, cracks, thread damage, defacing of permanent markings, and colour coding. Very few cylinders are failed by the hydrostatic test. Almost all cylinders that fail are failed according to visual inspection criteria.

When a cylinder is manufactured, its specification, including manufacturer, working pressure, test pressure, date of manufacture, capacity and weight are stamped on the cylinder. After a cylinder passes the test, the test date, (or the test expiry date in some countries such as Germany), is punched into the shoulder of the cylinder for easy verification at fill time. (Note: This is a European requirement.) The international standard for the stamp format is ISO 13769, Gas cylinders - Stamp marking.

Filling station operators may be required to check these details before filling the cylinder and may refuse to fill non-standard or out-of-test cylinders. (Note: This is a European requirement, a requirement of the US DOT, and a South African occupational health and safety requirement.)

=== Intervals between inspections and tests ===
A cylinder is due to be inspected and tested at the first time it is to be filled after the expiry of the interval as specified by the United Nations Recommendations on the Transport of Dangerous Goods, Model Regulations, or as specified by national or international standards applicable in the region of use.

- In the United States, an annual visual inspection is not required by the USDOT, though they do require a hydrostatic test every five years. The visual inspection requirement is a diving industry standard based on observations made during a review by the National Underwater Accident Data Center.
- In European Union countries a visual inspection is required every 2.5 years, and a hydrostatic test every five years.
- In Norway a hydrostatic test (including a visual inspection) is required 3 years after production date, then every 2 years.
- Legislation in Australia requires that cylinders are hydrostatically tested every twelve months.
- In South Africa a hydrostatic test is required every 4 years, and visual inspection every 2 years for cylinders to be refilled by a filling station within the jurisdiction of the Occupational Health and Safety Act, 1993. Eddy-current testing of neck threads must be done according to the manufacturer's recommendations.

=== Cleaning ===
Internal cleaning of diving cylinders may be required to remove contaminants or to allow effective visual inspection. Cleaning methods should remove contaminants and corrosion products without undue removal of structural metal. Chemical cleaning using solvents, detergents and pickling agents may be used depending on the contaminant and cylinder material. Tumbling with abrasive media may be needed for heavy contamination, particularly of heavy corrosion products.

External cleaning may also be required to remove contaminants, corrosion products or old paint or other coatings. Methods which remove the minimum amount of structural material are indicated. Solvents, detergents and bead blasting are generally used. Removal of coatings by the application of heat may render the cylinder unserviceable by affecting the crystalline microstructure of the metal. This is a particular hazard for aluminium alloy cylinders, which may not be exposed to temperatures above those stipulated by the manufacturer.

=== Service life ===
The service life of steel and aluminium diving cylinders is limited by the cylinder continuing to pass visual inspection and hydrostatic tests. There is no expiry date based on age, length of service or number of fills.

=== Sustained load cracking ===
The aluminum alloys used for diving cylinders are 6061 and 6351. 6351 alloy is subject to sustained load cracking and cylinders manufactured of this alloy should be periodically eddy-current tested according to national legislation and manufacturer's recommendations. 6351 alloy has been superseded for new manufacture, but many old cylinders are still in service, and are still legal and considered safe if they pass the periodic hydrostatic, visual and eddy-current tests required by regulation and as specified by the manufacturer. The number of cylinders that have failed catastrophically is in the order of 50 out of some 50 million manufactured. A larger number have failed the eddy-current test and visual inspection of neck threads, or have leaked and been removed from service without harm to anyone.

=== Accidents ===
The blast caused by a sudden release of the gas pressure inside a diving cylinder makes them very dangerous if mismanaged. The greatest risk of explosion exists while filling, but cylinders have also been known to burst when overheated. The cause of failure can range from reduced wall thickness or deep pitting due to internal corrosion, neck thread failure due to incompatible valve threads, or cracking due to fatigue, sustained high stresses, or overheating effects in aluminum. Tank bursting due to over-pressure may be prevented by a pressure-relief burst disc fitted to the cylinder valve, which bursts if the cylinder is over-pressurized and vents air at a rapid controlled rate to prevent catastrophic tank failure. Accidental rupture of the burst disc can also occur at lower pressures during filling, due to corrosive weakening or stress from repeated pressurization cycles, but is remedied by replacement of the disc. Bursting discs are not required in all jurisdictions.

Other failure modes that are a hazard while filling include valve thread failure, which can cause the valve to blow out of the cylinder neck, and filling whip failure.

Major diving accident and fatality studies conducted worldwide, including work by the Divers Alert Network, the Diving Incident Monitoring Study, and Project Stickybeak, have each identified cases where mortality was associated with the diving cylinder.

Some accidents associated with diving cylinders have been documented:

- A valve was ejected due to a mix-up between 3/4" NPSM and 3/4" BSP(F) valve threads, causing damage to a dive shop compressor room.
- During filling, a valve ejected due to incompatible threads and struck the operator's chest, killing the operator.
- A valve failed on a diver's emergency cylinder on a diving support vessel during preparation for a dive, injuring five divers. The cylinder valve was ejected at 180 bar due to an incompatible thread. The pillar valve had an M25x2 parallel thread, while the cylinder had a 3/4"x14 BSP parallel thread.
- A valve was ejected due to incompatible thread (metric valve in imperial cylinder) and injured a commercial diver by impact on the back of the helmet during preparations for a dive. The cylinder had been under pressure for several days following hydrostatic testing, and no particular triggering event was identified. The diver was knocked down and bruised but protected from serious injury by the helmet.
- A diving instructor's leg was nearly amputated by an ejected valve while attempting to remove a valve from a pressurised cylinder.
- A valve ejected during filling due to thread failure sank the dive boat. The vented bursting disk retainers in the cylinder valves had been replaced with solid screws.
- A filling hose failure severely injured the operator when the hose struck his face. The impact exposed the jawbone, and 14 stitches were required to close the wound.

Occupational injuries include cases of lateral epicondylitis (tennis elbow) that have been reported, from handling of scuba cylinders.

== Handling ==
Cylinders should not be left standing unattended unless secured so that they can not fall in reasonably foreseeable circumstances as an impact could damage the cylinder valve mechanism, and conceivably fracture the valve at the neck threads. This is more likely with taper thread valves, and when it happens most of the energy of the compressed gas is released within a second, and can accelerate the cylinder to speeds which can cause severe injury or damage to the surroundings.

A neatly assembled scuba set has regulators, gauges, and delicate computers stowed inside the buoyancy control device (BCD) or clipped where they will not be stepped on. The set is then placed under the boat bench or secured to a rack, which is the practice of a competent diver.

=== Long-term storage ===
Breathing-quality gases do not normally deteriorate during storage in steel or aluminum cylinders. As long as the water content is too low to promote internal corrosion, the stored gas will remain unchanged for years if stored at temperatures within the allowed working range for the cylinder, usually below 65 °C. If there is any doubt, checking the oxygen fraction will indicate whether the gas has changed, since the other components are inert. Any unusual smells would indicate that the cylinder or gas was contaminated at the time of filling. However, some authorities recommend releasing most of the contents and storing cylinders with a small positive pressure.

Aluminum cylinders have a low tolerance for heat, and a 3,000 pounds per square inch (210 bar) cylinder containing less than 1,500 pounds per square inch (100 bar) may lose sufficient strength in a fire to explode before the internal pressure rises enough to rupture the bursting disc, so storing aluminum cylinders with a bursting disc carries a lower explosion risk in case of fire if they are kept either full or nearly empty.

=== Transportation ===
Diving cylinders are classified by the UN as dangerous goods for transportation purposes (US: Hazardous materials). Selecting the Proper Shipping Name (well known by the abbreviation PSN) is a way to help ensure that the dangerous goods offered for transport accurately represent the hazards.

IATA Dangerous Goods Regulations (DGR) 55th Edition defines the Proper Shipping Name as "the name to be used to describe a particular article or substance in all shipping documents and notifications and, where appropriate, on packagings".

The International Maritime Dangerous Goods Code (IMDG Code) defines the Proper Shipping Name as "that portion of the entry most accurately describing the goods in the Dangerous Goods List which is shown in upper-case characters (plus any letters which form an integral part of the name)."

Hazardous materials descriptions and proper shipping names (PSN)	Hazard class or division	Identification numbers	Label codes	Quantity limitations
Air, compressed	2.2	UN1002	2.2	Passenger aircraft/rail: 75 kg Cargo aircraft only: 150 kg
Argon, compressed	2.2	UN1006	2.2	Passenger aircraft/rail: 75 kg Cargo aircraft only: 150 kg
Helium, compressed	2.2	UN1046	2.2	Passenger aircraft/rail: 75 kg Cargo aircraft only: 150 kg
Nitrogen, compressed	2.2	UN1066	2.2	Passenger aircraft/rail: 75 kg Cargo aircraft only: 150 kg
Oxygen, compressed	2.2	UN1072	2.2, 5.1	Passenger aircraft/rail: 75 kg Cargo aircraft only: 150 kg
Compressed gas N.O.S. (not otherwise specified) e.g. normoxic and hypoxic Heliox and Trimix	2.2	UN1956	2.2	Passenger aircraft/rail: 75 kg Cargo aircraft only: 150 kg
Compressed gas, oxidising, N.O.S e.g. Nitrox	2.2	UN3156	2.2, 5.1	Passenger aircraft/rail: 75 kg Cargo aircraft only: 150 kg

==== International air ====
International Civil Aviation Organization (ICAO) Technical Instructions for the Safe Transport of Dangerous Goods by Air states that provided that pressure in diving cylinders is less than 200 kilopascals (2 bar; 29 psi), these can be carried as checked in or carry-on baggage. It maybe necessary to empty the cylinder to verify this. Once emptied, the cylinder valve should be closed to prevent moisture entering the cylinder. Security restrictions implemented by individual countries may further limit or forbid the carriage of some items permitted by ICAO, and airlines and security screening agencies have the right to refuse the carriage of certain items.

==== Europe ====
Since 1996 the carriage of dangerous goods legislation of the UK has been harmonized with that of Europe. Dangerous goods to be carried internationally in road vehicles must comply with standards for the packaging and labelling of the dangerous goods, and appropriate construction and operating standards for the vehicles and crew.

The regulations cover transportation of gas cylinders in a vehicle in a commercial environment. Transportation of pressurised diving gas cylinders with a combined water capacity of less than 1000 litres on a vehicle for personal use is exempt from ADR. Transport of gas cylinders in a vehicle, for commercial purposes, must follow basic legal safety requirements and, unless specifically exempted, must comply with ADR.

Diving gases, including compressed air, oxygen, nitrox, heliox, trimix, helium and argon, are non-toxic, non flammable, and may be oxidizer or asphyxiant, and are rated in Transport category 3. The threshold quantity for these gases is 1000 litres combined water capacity of the cylinders. Pressure must be within the rated working pressure of the cylinder. Empty air cylinders at atmospheric pressure are rated in Transport category 4, and there is no threshold quantity.

Commercial loads below the 1000 litres threshold level are exempt from some of the requirements of ADR, but must comply with basic legal and safety requirements: All loads above the threshold must comply with the full requirements of ADR.

==== United States ====
Transportation of hazardous materials for commercial purposes in the USA is regulated by Code of Federal Regulations Title 49 - Transportation, (abbreviated 49 CFR). A cylinder containing 200 kPa (29.0 psig/43.8 psia) or greater at 20 °C (68 °F) of non-flammable, nonpoisonous compressed gas, and being transported for commercial purposes is classified as HAZMAT (hazardous materials) in terms of 49 CFR 173.115(b) (1). Cylinders manufactured to DOT standards or special permits (exemptions) issued by the Pipeline and Hazardous Materials Safety Administration and filled to the authorized working pressure are legal for commercial transport in the USA under the provisions and conditions of the regulations. Cylinders manufactured outside the USA may be transported under a special permit, and these have been issued for solid metal and composite cylinders with working pressures of up to 300 bar (4400 psi) by several manufacturers.

Commercial transportation of breathing gas cylinders with a combined weight of more than 1000 pounds may only be done by a commercial HAZMAT transportation company. Transport of cylinders with a combined weight of less than 1,000 pounds requires a manifest. The cylinders must be tested and inspected to federal standards, and each cylinder must be marked with its contents. Transportation must be done in a safe manner, with the cylinders restrained from movement. No special licence is required. DOT regulations require content labels for all cylinders under the regulations, but according to PSI, labelling of breathing air will not be enforced. Oxygen or non-air oxidizing (O_{2} ≥ 23.5%) mixtures must be labelled. Private (non-commercial) transport of scuba cylinders is not covered by this regulation.

Empty scuba tanks or scuba tanks pressurized at less than 200 kPa are not restricted as hazardous materials. Scuba cylinders are only allowed in checked baggage or as a carry-on if the cylinder valve is completely disconnected from the cylinder and the cylinder has an open end to allow for a visual inspection inside.

== Surface finish, colour-coding and labeling ==
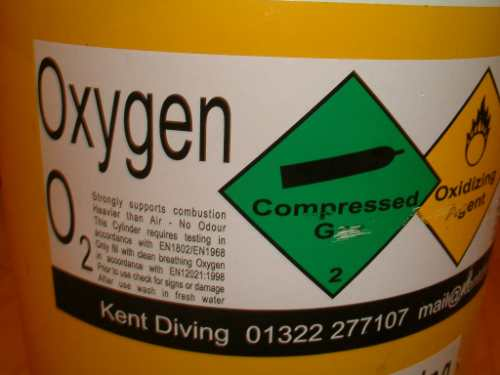
A contents label for oxygen usage (UK), which incorporates the hazardous materials diamonds for compressed gas (green) and oxidizer (yellow)

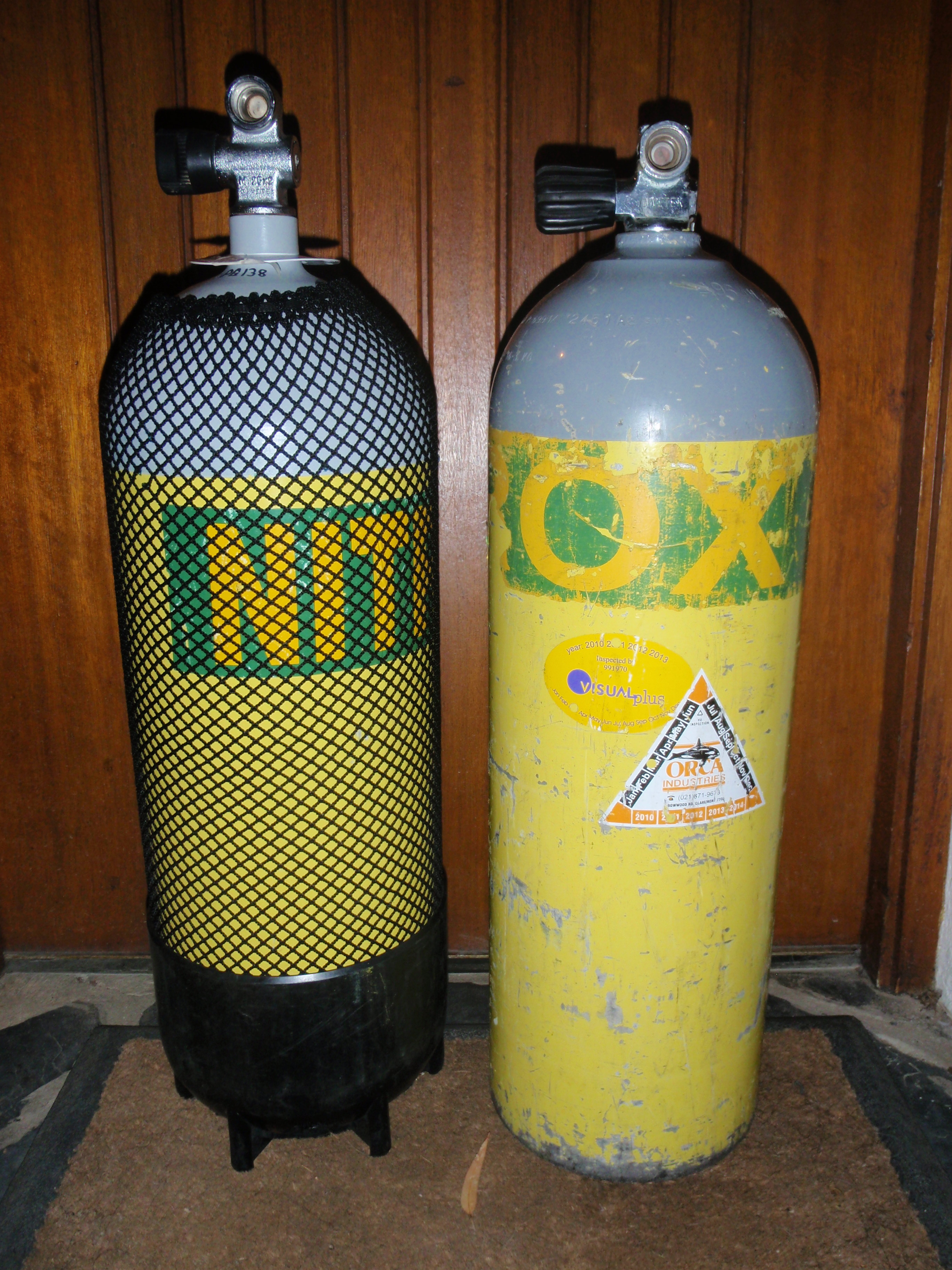
A steel 15-litre cylinder with net and boot and a bare 12-litre aluminium cylinder. Both are labeled for Nitrox use. The aluminium cylinder also displays a triangular label specifying the date of the most recent internal inspection and an oval label recording the most recent neck thread eddy-current test.

Aluminium cylinders may be marketed with an external paint coating, a low temperature powder coating, plain or coloured anodised finish, bead-blasted matt finish, brushed finish, or mill finish (no surface treatment). The material is inherently corrosion resistant if kept clean and dry between uses. Coatings are generally applied for cosmetic purposes or to meet legal colour-coding requirements.

Steel cylinders are more sensitive to corrosion when wet, and are usually coated to protect against corrosion. The usual finishes include hot-dip galvanisation, zinc-spray, and heavy duty paint systems. Paint may be applied over zinc coatings for cosmetic purposes or colour coding. Steel cylinders without anti-corrosion coatings rely on the paint to protect against rusting, and when the paint is damaged, they will rust on the exposed areas. This can be prevented or delayed by repair of the painted finish.

=== Worldwide ===
The colours permitted for diving cylinders vary considerably by region, and to some extent by the gas mixture contained. In some parts of the world there is no legislation controlling the colour of diving cylinders. In other regions the colour of cylinders used for commercial diving, or for all underwater diving, may be specified by national standards.

In many recreational diving settings where air and nitrox are the widely used gases, nitrox cylinders are identified with a green stripe on yellow background. Aluminium diving cylinders may be painted or anodized and when anodized may be coloured or left in their natural silver. Steel diving cylinders, if not galvanised, are usually painted, to reduce corrosion, often yellow or white to increase visibility. In some industrial cylinder identification colour tables, yellow shoulders means chlorine, and more generally within Europe it refers to cylinders with toxic and/or corrosive contents. However, this is of no significance in scuba since gas fittings would not be compatible.

Cylinders that are used for partial pressure gas blending with pure oxygen may also be required to display an "oxygen service certificate" label indicating they have been prepared for use with high partial pressures and gas fractions of oxygen.

=== European Union ===
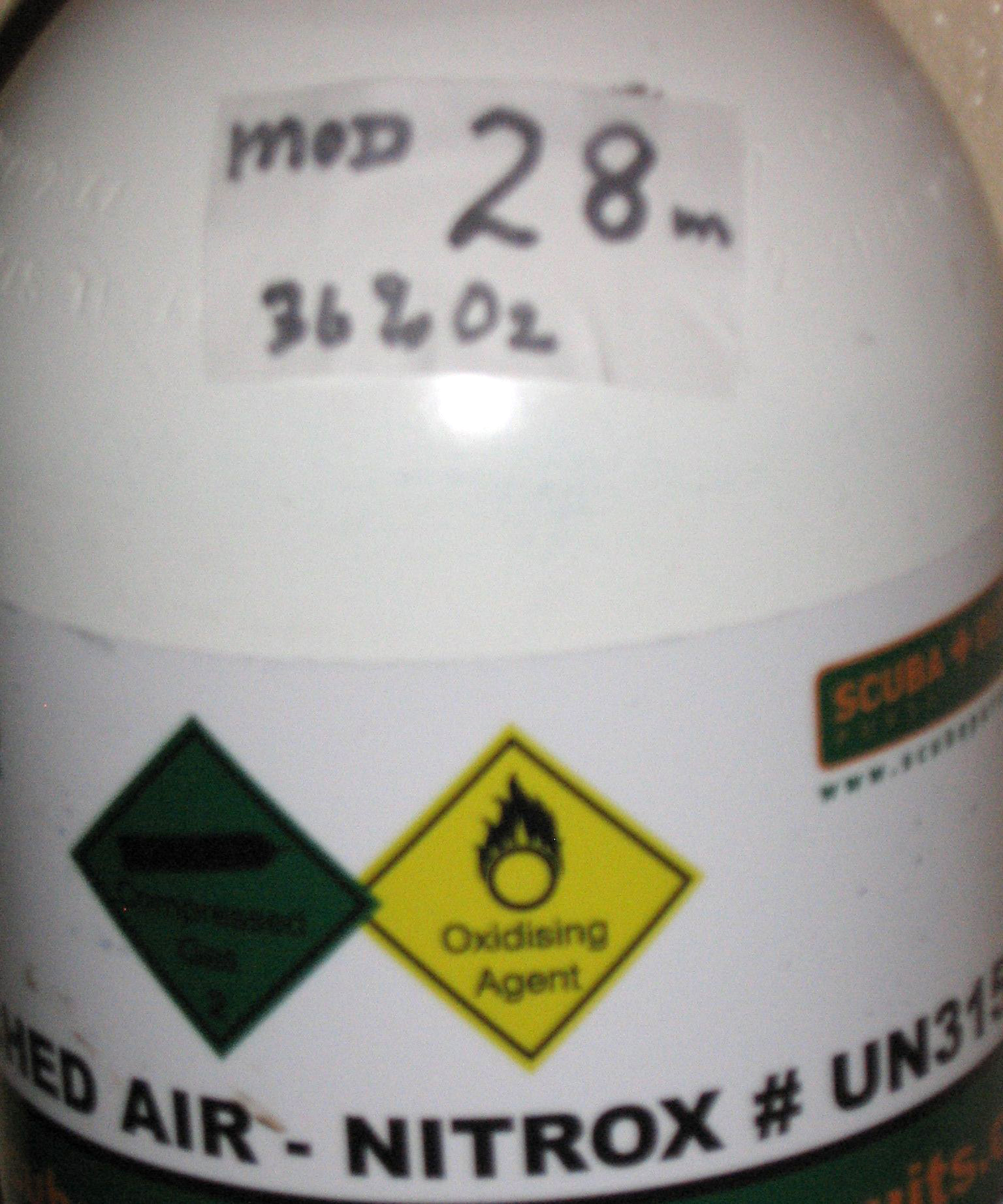
Nitrox contents and hazard label used in the UK. The diver has added a temporary maximum operating depth (MOD) indication for easy reference.

In the European Union gas cylinders may be colour-coded according to EN 1098-3 in the shoulder, the domed top of the cylinder between the parallel section and the pillar valve. In the UK this standard is optional. For mixed gases, the colours can be either bands or "quarters".

- Air has either a white (RAL 9010) top and black (RAL 9005) band on the shoulder, or white (RAL 9010) and black (RAL 9005) "quartered" shoulders.
- Heliox has either a white (RAL 9010) top and brown (RAL 8008) band on the shoulder, or white (RAL 9010) and brown (RAL 8008) "quartered" shoulders.
- Nitrox, like Air, has either a white (RAL 9010) top and black (RAL 9005) band on the shoulder, or white (RAL 9010) and black (RAL 9005) "quartered" shoulders.
- Pure oxygen has a white shoulder (RAL 9010).
- Pure helium has a brown shoulder (RAL 9008).
- Trimix has a white, black and brown segmented shoulder.

These breathing gas cylinders must also be labeled with their contents. The label should state the type of breathing gas contained by the cylinder.

=== Offshore ===
Breathing gas containers for offshore use may be coded and marked according to IMCA D043. IMCA colour coding for individual cylinders allows the body of the cylinder to be any colour that is not likely to cause misinterpretation of the hazard identified by the colour code of the shoulder.

Commonly accepted gas container colour coding in the diving industry.
Gas	Symbol	Typical shoulder colours	Cylinder shoulder	Quad upper frame/ frame valve end
Calibration gases	as appropriate	Illustration of cylinder shoulder painted pink for calibration gas	Pink	Pink
Carbon dioxide	CO_{2}	Illustration of cylinder shoulder painted grey for carbon dioxide	Grey	Grey
Helium	He	Illustration of cylinder shoulder painted brown for helium	Brown	Brown
Medical oxygen	O_{2}	Illustration of cylinder shoulder painted white for medical oxygen	White	White
Nitrogen	N_{2}	Illustration of cylinder shoulder painted black for nitrogen	Black	Black
Oxygen and helium mixtures (Heliox)	O_{2}/He	Illustration of cylinder shoulder painted in brown and white quarters Illustration of cylinder shoulder painted in brown (lower and white (upper) bands	Brown and white quarters or bands	Brown and white short (8 inches (20 cm)) alternating bands
Oxygen, helium and nitrogen mixtures (Trimix)	O_{2}/He/N_{2}	Illustration of cylinder shoulder painted in brown, black and white sixths for a mixture of helium, nitrogen and oxygen. Illustration of cylinder shoulder painted in brown, black and white bands for a mixture of helium, nitrogen and oxygen	Black, white and brown quarters or bands	Black, white and brown short (8 inches (20 cm)) alternating bands
Oxygen and nitrogen mixtures (Nitrox) including air	N_{2}/O_{2}	Illustration of cylinder shoulder painted in black and white quarters for a mixture of oxygen and nitrogen. Illustration of cylinder shoulder painted in black (lower) and white (upper) bands for a mixture of oxygen and nitrogen.	Black and white quarters or bands	Black and white short (8 inches (20 cm)) alternating bands

=== South Africa ===
Scuba cylinders are required to comply with the colours and markings specified in the current revision of SANS 10019. This requirement applies where the cylinders will be filled or used in any situation where the Occupational Health and Safety Act, 1993 applies.

- Cylinder colour is Golden yellow with a French grey shoulder.
- Cylinders containing gases other than air or medical oxygen must have a transparent adhesive label stuck on below the shoulder with the word NITROX or TRIMIX in green and the composition of the gas listed.
- Cylinders containing medical oxygen must be painted black with a white shoulder.

== Manufacturers ==
Cylinder manufacturers identify their products using their registered stamp marking on the cylinder shoulder.

Steel cylinders:

- Avesta Jernverks AB (Sweden)
- Dalmine (cylinders) (Italy) (historical)
- Eurocylinder Systems AG (Apolda, Germany)
- Faber Industrie S.p.A. (Cividale del Friuli, Italy)
- Industrie Werke Karlsruhe Aktiengesellschaft (IWKA) (Germany) (historical)
- Pressed Steel Tank (United States)
- Vítkovice Cylinders a.s. (Ostrava, Czechia)
- Worthington Cylinders GesmbH (Austria)
  - Josef Heiser (Austria), now Worthington Cylinders GesmbH
- Worthington Cylinder Corporation (United States)

Aluminium cylinders:

- Catalina Cylinder Corp (United States)
- Hulett Cylinders (South Africa) (historical)
- Luxfer (United Kingdom, United States, France) (They announced in 2021 they are leaving the aluminum production market in the USA.) Luxfer Gas Cylinders is based in Riverside, California, and has manufacturing facilities in the U.S., England, Canada, China and India.
- SM Gerzat (France) now Luxfer, France
- Walter Kidde and Co (United States) (historical)
- Metal Impact / Thunderbird cylinders (United States)

== See also ==
- Bottled oxygen – Oxygen stored in lightweight portable high pressure cylinders (for climbing and mountaineering)
- Gas cylinder – Cylindrical container for storing pressurised gas
- Scuba set – Self-contained underwater breathing apparatus
- Testing and inspection of diving cylinders – Periodical inspection and testing to revalidate fitness for service
