= Work of breathing =

Energy expended to inhale and exhale a breathing gas

Work of breathing (WOB) is the energy expended to inhale and exhale a breathing gas. It is usually expressed as work per unit volume, for example, joules/litre, or as a work rate (power), such as joules/min or equivalent units, as it is not particularly useful without a reference to volume or time. It can be calculated in terms of the pulmonary pressure multiplied by the change in pulmonary volume, or in terms of the oxygen consumption attributable to breathing.

In a normal resting state the work of breathing constitutes about 5% of the total body oxygen consumption. It can increase considerably due to illness or constraints on gas flow imposed by breathing apparatus, ambient pressure, or breathing gas composition.

== Mechanism of breathing ==
The normal relaxed state of the lung and chest is partially empty. Further exhalation requires muscular work. Inhalation is an active process requiring work. Some of this work is to overcome frictional resistance to flow, and part is used to deform elastic tissues, and is stored as potential energy, which is recovered during the passive process of exhalation, Tidal breathing is breathing that does not require active muscle contraction during exhalation. The required energy is provided by the stored elastic energy.

When there is increased gas flow resistance, the optimal respiratory rate decreases.

=== Work against elastic recoil ===
This work (generally during the inhalation phase) is stored as potential energy which is recovered during exhalation.

=== Work against non-elastic resistance ===
A pressure difference is required to overcome the frictional resistance to gas flow due to viscosity, inertial resistance due to density, and to provide non-elastic components of movement of the airway tissues to accommodate pulmonary volume change.

=== Dynamic airway compression ===
Dynamic airway compression occurs when intrapleural pressure equals or exceeds alveolar pressure, which causes dynamic collapsing of the lung airways. It is termed dynamic given the transpulmonary pressure (alveolar pressure − intrapleural pressure) varies based on factors including lung volume, compliance, resistance, existing pathologies, etc. It occurs during forced expiration when intrapleural pressure is greater than atmospheric pressure (positive barometric values), and not during passive expiration when intrapleural pressure remains at subatmospheric pressures (negative barometric values). Clinically, dynamic compression is most commonly associated to the wheezing sound during forced expiration such as in individuals with chronic obstructive pulmonary disorder (COPD). The density of the gas also influences the pressure reduction in the airways, and a higher density causes a greater drop in pressure for a given volumetric flow rate, which has consequences in ambient pressure diving, and can limit ventilation at densities over 6g/litre. It can be exacerbated by a negative static lung load. The effect is modeled by the Starling resistor

== Mechanics ==
Work is defined as a force applied over a distance. The SI unit of work is the Joule, equivalent to a force of 1 Newton exerted along a distance of 1 metre. In gas flow across a constant section this equates to a volume flowing against a pressure: (Note: Force = Pressure x Area, and Distance = Volume / Area. When both refer to the same area, Force x Distance = (Pressure x Area) x (Volume/Area) = Pressure x Volume)

Work = Pressure x Volume

and Power = Work / time

with SI units for Power: Watts = Joules per second

The term "work of breathing" should be more accurately referred to as the "power of breathing," unless it is in reference to the work associated with a specific number of breaths or a given interval of time. It is important to differentiate between the terms "breathing rate" and "breathing frequency." Although the two are frequently used interchangeably, "breathing rate" refers to the respiratory rate and is described in breaths per minute (BPM). On the other hand, "breathing frequency" refers to the frequency composition of a single breath and is described in hertz.

== Clinical signs of increased work of breathing ==
Because measuring the work of breathing requires complex instrumentation, measuring it in patients with acute serious illness is difficult and risky. Instead, physicians determine if the work of breathing is increased by gestalt or by examining the patient looking for signs of increased breathing effort. These signs include nasal flaring, the contraction of sternomastoid, and thoraco-abdominal paradox.

== Work of breathing in ambient pressure diving ==
Work of breathing is affected by several factors in underwater diving at ambient pressure. There are physiological effects of immersion, physical effects of ambient pressure and breathing gas mixture, and mechanical effects of the gas supply system.

=== Immersion effects ===
The properties of the lung can vary if a pressure differential exists between the breathing gas supply and the ambient pressure on the chest. The relaxed internal pressure in the lungs is equal to the pressure at the mouth, and in the immersed diver, the pressure on the chest may vary from the pressure at the mouth depending on the attitude of the diver in the water. This pressure difference is the static lung load or hydrostatic imbalance.

A negative static lung load occurs when the gas supply pressure is lower than the ambient pressure at the chest, and the diver needs to apply more effort to inhale. The small negative pressure differential inside the air passages induces blood engorgement of the distensible lung blood vessels, reducing the compliance of the lung tissue and making the lung stiffer than normal, therefore requiring more muscular effort to move a given volume of gas through the airways. This effect can occur in an upright open-circuit diver, where the chest is deeper than the regulator, and in a rebreather diver if the chest is deeper than the counterlung and will increase the work of breathing and in extreme cases lead to dynamic airway compression. The effects of positive static lung load in these circumstances have not been clearly demonstrated, but may delay this effect.

=== Effects of pressure and gas composition ===
Density of a given gas mixture is proportional to absolute pressure at a constant temperature throughout the range of respirable pressures, and resistance to flow is a function of flow velocity, density and viscosity.

As density increases, the amount of pressure difference required to drive a given flow rate increases. When the density exceeds about 6g/litre the exercise tolerance of the diver becomes significantly reduced, and by 10 g/litre it is marginal. At this stage even moderate exertion may cause a carbon dioxide buildup that cannot be reversed by increased ventilation, as the work required to increase ventilation produces more carbon dioxide than is eliminated by the increased ventilation, and flow may be choked by the effects of dynamic airway compression. In some cases the person may resort to coughing exhalation to try to increase flow. This effect can be delayed by using lower density gas such as helium in the breathing mix to keep the combined density below 6 g/litre.

On air or nitrox, maximum ventilation drops to about half at 30 m, equivalent to 4 bar absolute and gas density of about 5.2 g/litre. The 6 g/litre recommended soft limit occurs at about 36 m and by the recommended recreational diving depth limit of 40 m, air and nitrox density reaches 6.5 g/litre

The maximum voluntary ventilation and breathing capacity are approximately inversely proportional to the square root of gas density, which for a given gas is proportional to absolute pressure. Use of a low density gas like helium or hydrogen to replace nitrogen in the mixture helps not only to reduce the narcotic effects, but also the density and thereby the work of breathing. To be non-combustible, there must be less than 4% by volume of oxygen in a hydrogen rich mixture. The presence and concentration of other diluents such as nitrogen or helium does not affect the flammability limit in a hydrogen rich mixture.

=== Underwater breathing apparatus ===
Graph of the breathing resistance of an open-circuit demand regulator. The area of the graph (green) is proportional to the net mechanical work of breathing for a single breathing cycle

In the diving industry the performance of breathing apparatus is often referred to as work of breathing. In this context it generally means the external work of an average single breath taken through the specified apparatus for given conditions of ambient pressure, underwater environment, flow rate during the breathing cycle, and gas mixture - underwater divers may breathe oxygen-rich breathing gas to reduce the risk of decompression sickness, or gases containing helium to reduce narcotic effects. Helium also has the effect of reducing the work of breathing by reducing density of the mixture, though helium's viscosity is fractionally greater than nitrogen's. Standards for these conditions exist and to make useful comparisons between breathing apparatus they must be tested to the same standard.

Free-flow systems; In a free-flow breathing apparatus, the user breathes from the volume of ambient pressure gas in front of the face. If the supply is adequate, exhaled gas is flushed away by fresh gas flow, and only fresh gas is inhaled – there is no dead space. Work of breathing is affected by gas density due to pressure and gas composition, and there may be positive or negative static lung loading, but there is no additional external work of breathing due to airflow through the breathing apparatus. Surface-supplied divers who will be working hard underwater often use free-flow systems for this reason.

Demand systems:

Recirculating systems: Work of breathing of a rebreather has two main components: Resistive work of breathing is due to the flow restriction of the gas passages causing resistance to flow of the breathing gas, and exists in all applications where there is no externally powered ventilation. Hydrostatic work of breathing is only applicable to diving applications, and is due to difference in pressure between the lungs of the diver and the counterlungs of the rebreather. This pressure difference is generally due to a difference in hydrostatic pressure caused by a difference in depth between lung and counterlung, but can be modified by ballasting the moving side of a bellows counterlung.

Resistive work of breathing is the sum of all the restrictions to flow due to bends, corrugations, changes of flow direction, valve cracking pressures, flow through scrubber media, etc., and the resistance to flow of the gas, due to inertia and viscosity, which are influenced by density, which is a function of molecular weight and pressure. Rebreather design can limit the mechanical aspects of flow resistance, particularly by the design of the scrubber, counterlungs and breathing hoses. Diving rebreathers are influenced by the variations of work of breathing due to gas mixture choice and depth. Helium content reduces work of breathing, and increased depth increases work of breathing. Work of breathing can also be increased by excessive wetness of the scrubber media, usually a consequence of a leak in the breathing loop, or by using a grain size of absorbent that is too small. Both of these factors cause restrictions to the gas flow.

The semi-closed rebreather systems developed by Drägerwerk in the early 20th century as a scuba gas supply for Standard diving dress, using oxygen or nitrox, and the US Navy Mark V Heliox helmet developed in the 1930s for deep diving, circulated the breathing gas through the helmet and scrubber by using an injector system where the added gas entrained the loop gas and produced a stream of scrubbed gas past the diver inside the helmet, which eliminated external dead space and resistive work of breathing, but was not suitable for high breathing rates.

==== Standards for testing underwater breathing apparatus ====
- EN 250:2014. Respiratory equipment – Open-circuit self-contained compressed air diving apparatus – Requirements, testing, marking.
- EN 14143:2013. Respiratory equipment. Self-contained re-breathing diving apparatus
- EN 15333 –1: 2008 COR 2009 – Respiratory Equipment – Open-Circuit Umbilical Supplied Compressed Gas Diving Apparatus – Part 1: Demand Apparatus.
- BS 8547:2016 defines requirements for demand regulators to be used at depths exceeding 50 m.

=== Variations and management of work of breathing ===
Factors which influence the work of breathing of an underwater breathing apparatus include density and viscosity of the gas, flow rates, cracking pressure (the pressure differential required to open the demand valve), and back pressure over exhaust valves. Diver orientation affects the relative depths of lungs and regulator or breathing loop, which can cause variation between positive and negative pressure breathing.

Work of breathing of a diver has a physiological component as well as the equipment component. for a given breathing gas mixture, the density will increase with an increase in depth. A higher gas density requires more effort to accelerate the gas in the transitions between inhalation and exhalation. To minimise the work of breathing the flow velocity can be reduced, but this will reduce RMV unless the depth of breathing is increased to compensate. Slow deep breathing improves efficiency of respiration by increasing gas turnover in the alveoli, and exertion must be limited to match the gas transfer possible from the RMV which can be comfortably maintained over long periods. Exceeding this maximum continuous exertion may lead to carbon dioxide buildup, which can cause accelerated breathing rate, with increased turbulence, leading to lower efficiency, reduced RMV and higher work of breathing in a positive feedback loop. At extreme depths this can occur even at relatively low levels of exertion, and it may be difficult or impossible to break the cycle. The resulting stress can be a cause of panic as the perception is of an insufficient gas supply due to carbon dioxide buildup though oxygenation may be adequate.

Negative static lung load increases work of breathing and can vary depending on the relative depth of the regulator diaphragm to the lungs in open circuit equipment, and the relative depth of the counterlung to the lungs in a rebreather.

Gas density at ambient pressure is a limiting factor on the ability of a diver to effectively eliminate carbon dioxide at depth for a given work of breathing. At increased ambient pressure the increased breathing gas density causes greater airway resistance. Maximum exercise ventilation and maximum voluntary ventilation are reduced as a function of density, which for a given gas mixture is proportional to pressure. Maximum voluntary ventilation is approximated by a square root function of gas density. Exhalation flow rate is limited by effort independent turbulent flow. Once this occurs further attempts to increase flow rate are actively counterproductive and contribute to further accumulation of carbon dioxide. The effects of negative static lung load are amplified by increased gas density.

To reduce risk of hypercapnia, divers may adopt a breathing pattern that is slower and deeper than normal rather than fast and shallow, as this gives maximum gas exchange per unit effort by minimising turbulence, friction, and dead space effects.

=== Carbon dioxide retention and toxicity ===
Carbon dioxide is a product of cell metabolism which is eliminated by gas exchange in the lungs while breathing. The rate of production is variable with exertion, but there is a basic minimum. If the rate of elimination is less than the rate of production, the levels will increase, and produce symptoms of toxicity such as headache, shortness of breath and mental impairment, eventually loss of consciousness, which can lead to drowning. In diving there are factors which increase carbon dioxide production (exertion), and factors which can impair elimination, making divers particularly vulnerable to carbon dioxide toxicity.

Oxygen is consumed and carbon dioxide produced in the same quantities underwater as at the surface for the same amount of work, but breathing requires work, and work of breathing can be much greater underwater, and work of breathing is similar to other forms of work in the production of carbon dioxide.

The ability of a diver to respond to increases in work of breathing is limited. As work of breathing increases, the additional carbon dioxide produce in doing this work pushes up the need for higher elimination rate, which is proportional to ventilation, in the case of negligible carbon dioxide in the inspired air.

Carbon dioxide production by the tissues is a simple function of tissue metabolism and oxygen consumption. The more work done in a tissue, the more oxygen will be consumed and the more carbon dioxide will be produced. Carbon dioxide removal in the alveoli depends on the partial pressure gradient for carbon dioxide diffusion between blood and the alveolar gas. This gradient is maintained by flushing carbon dioxide out of the alveoli during breathing, which depends on replacing air in the alveoli with more carbon dioxide by air with less carbon dioxide. The more air moved in and out of the alveoli during breathing, the more carbon dioxide is flushed out, and the greater the pressure gradient between the venous blood and alveolar gas that drives carbon dioxide diffusion from the blood. Maintenance of the correct carbon dioxide levels is critically dependent on adequate lung ventilation, and there are multiple aspects of diving that can interfere with adequate ventilation of the lungs.

Carbon dioxide retention as a consequence of excessively high work of breathing may cause direct symptoms of carbon dioxide toxicity, and synergistic effects with nitrogen narcosis and CNS oxygen toxicity which is aggravated by cerebral vasodilation due to high carbon dioxide levels causing increased dosage of oxygen to the brain.

=== Measurement of underwater breathing apparatus performance ===
The ANSTI machine is used for automated testing of underwater breathing apparatus.

== See also ==
- Breathing performance of regulators – Capacity of breathing regulators to function as specified
