= Zones of the lung =

The zones of the lung divide the lung into four vertical regions, based upon the relationship between the pressure in the alveoli (PA), in the arteries (Pa), in the veins (Pv) and the pulmonary interstitial pressure (Pi):

- Zone 1: PA > Pa > Pv
- Zone 2: Pa > PA > Pv
- Zone 3: Pa > Pv > PA
- Zone 4: Pa > Pi > Pv > PA

This concept is generally attributed to an article by West et al. in 1964, but was actually proposed two years earlier by Permutt et al. In this article, Permutt suggests "The pressure in the pulmonary arteries and veins is less at the top than at the bottom of the lung. It is quite likely that there is a portion of the lung toward the top in an upright subject in which the pressure in the pulmonary arteries is less than alveolar pressure."

The concept is as follows:

Alveolar pressure (PA) at end expiration is equal to atmospheric pressure (0 cm H_{2}O differential pressure, at zero flow), plus or minus 2 cm H_{2}O (1.5 mmHg) throughout the lung. On the other hand, gravity causes a gradient in blood pressure between the top and bottom of the lung of 20 mmHg in the erect position (roughly half of that in the supine position). Overall, mean pulmonary venous pressure is ~5 mmHg. Local venous pressure falls to -5 at the apexes and rises to +15 mmHg at the bases, again for the erect lung. Pulmonary blood pressure is typically in the range 25–10 mmHg with a mean pressure of 15 mmHg. Regional arterial blood pressure is typically in the range 5 mmHg near the apex of the lung to 25 mmHg at the base.

Zone 1 is not observed in the normal healthy human lung. In normal health pulmonary arterial (Pa) pressure exceeds alveolar pressure (PA) in all parts of the lung. It is generally only observed when a person is ventilated with positive pressure or hemorrhage. In these circumstances, blood vessels can become completely collapsed by alveolar pressure (PA) and blood does not flow through these regions. They become alveolar dead space.

Zone 2 is the part of the lungs about 3 cm above the heart. In this region blood flows in pulses. At first there is no flow because of obstruction at the venous end of the capillary bed. Pressure from the arterial side builds up until it exceeds alveolar pressure and flow resumes. This dissipates the capillary pressure and returns to the start of the cycle. Flow here is sometimes compared to a starling resistor or waterfall effect.

Zone 3 comprises the majority of the lungs in health. There is no external resistance to blood flow and blood flow is continuous throughout the cardiac cycle. Flow is determined by the Ppa-Ppv difference (Ppa - Ppv), which is constant down this portion of the lung. However, transmural pressure across the wall of the blood vessels increases down this zone due to gravity. Consequently, the vessels wall are more stretched so the caliber of the vessels increases causing an increase in flow due to lower resistance.

Zone 4 can be seen at the lung bases at low lung volumes or in pulmonary edema. Pulmonary interstitial pressure (Pi) rises as lung volume decreases due to reduced radial tethering of the lung parenchyma. Pi is highest at the base of the lung due to the weight of the above lung tissue. Pi can also rise due to an increased volume of 'leaked' fluid from the pulmonary vasculature (pulmonary edema). An increase in Pi causes extraalveolar blood vessels to reduce in caliber, in turn causing blood flow to decrease (extraalveolar blood vessels are those blood vessels outside alveoli). Intraalveolar blood vessels (pulmonary capillaries) are thin walled vessels adjacent to alveoli which are subject to the pressure changes described by zones 1–3. Flow in zone 4 is governed by the arteriointerstitial pressure difference (Pa − Pi). This is because as Pi rises, the arterial caliber is reduced, thereby increasing resistance to flow. The Pa/Pv difference remains unchanged since Pi is applied over both vessels.

The ventilation/perfusion ratio (V/Q ratio) is higher in zone #1 (the apex of lung) when a person is standing than it is in zone #3 (the base of lung) because perfusion is nearly absent. However, ventilation and perfusion are highest in base of the lung, resulting in a comparatively lower V/Q ratio.
