= Scuba gas planning =

Estimation of breathing gas mixtures and quantities required for a planned dive profile

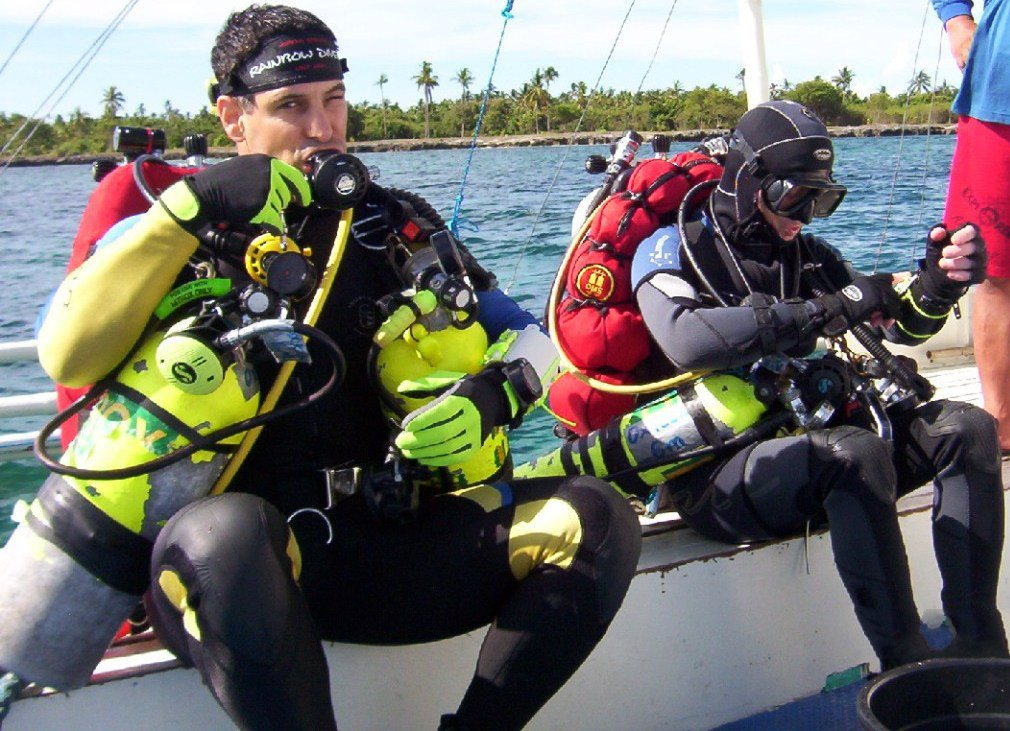
A decompression dive may require the use of more than one gas mixture

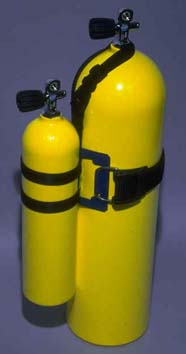
An independent reserve gas supply in a pony cylinder

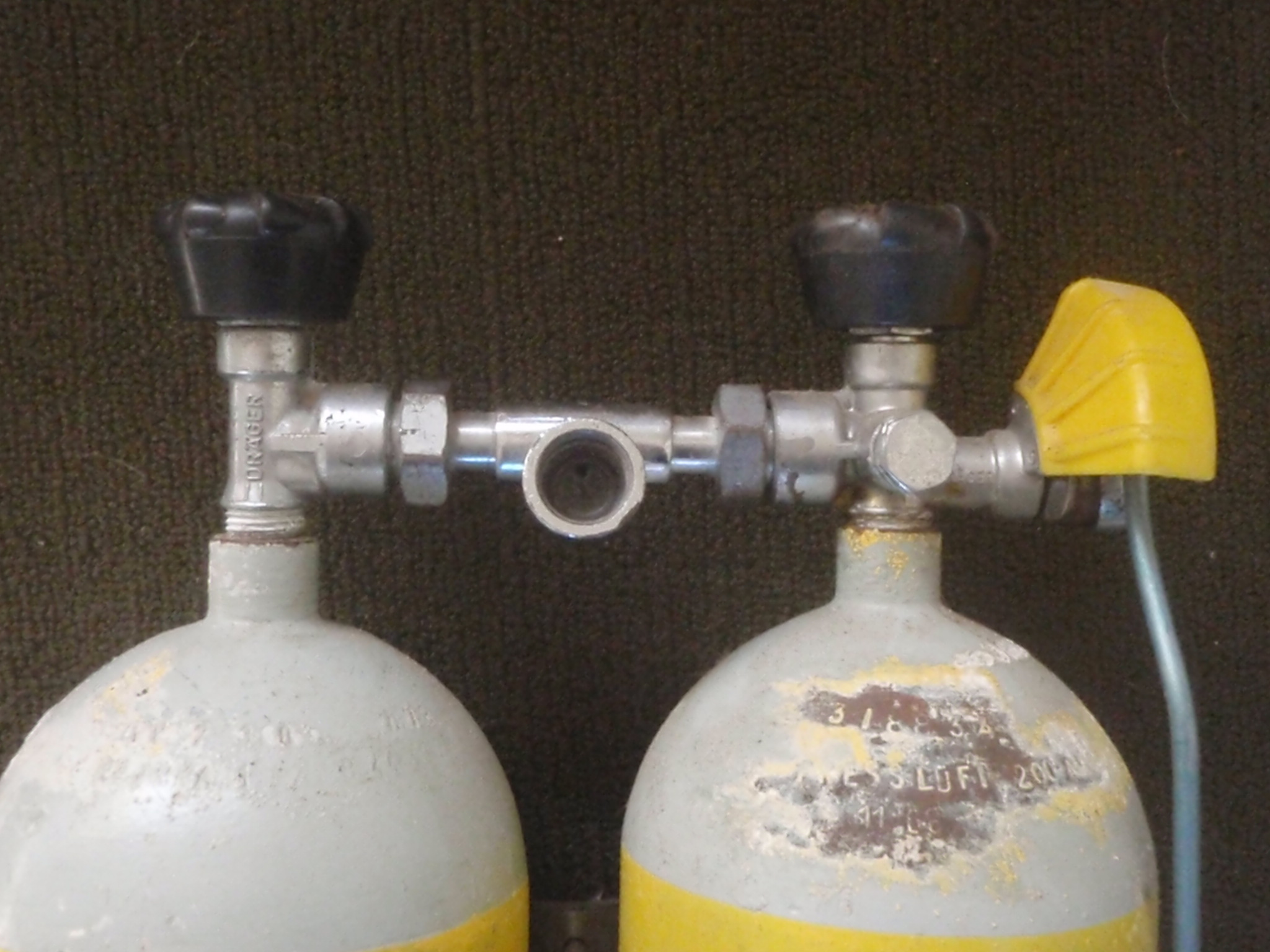
A reserve valve will keep some air in reserve until the valve is opened

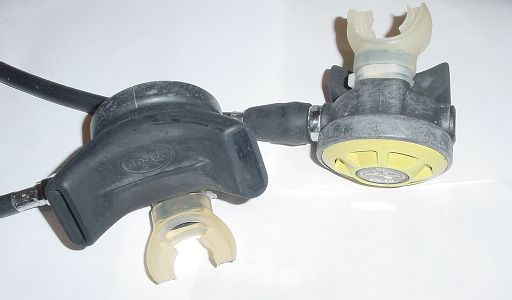
Most recreational divers rely on their buddy to supply air in an emergency via a second demand valve

Scuba gas planning is the aspect of dive planning and of gas management which deals with the calculation or estimation of the amounts and mixtures of gases to be used for a planned dive. It may assume that the dive profile, including decompression, is known, but the process may be iterative, involving changes to the dive profile as a consequence of the gas requirement calculation, or changes to the gas mixtures chosen. Use of calculated reserves based on planned dive profile and estimated gas consumption rates rather than an arbitrary pressure is sometimes referred to as rock bottom gas management. The purpose of gas planning is to ensure that for all reasonably foreseeable contingencies, the divers of a team have sufficient breathing gas to safely return to a place where more breathing gas is available. In almost all cases this will be the surface.

Gas planning includes the following aspects:

- Choice of breathing gases
- Choice of scuba configuration
- Estimation of gas required for the planned dive, including bottom gas, travel gas, and decompression gases, as appropriate to the profile.
- Estimation of gas quantities for reasonably foreseeable contingencies. Under stress it is likely that a diver will increase breathing rate and decrease swimming speed. Both of these lead to a higher gas consumption during an emergency exit or ascent.
- Choice of cylinders to carry the required gases. Each cylinder volume and working pressure must be sufficient to contain the required quantity of gas.
- Calculation of the pressures for each of the gases in each of the cylinders to provide the required quantities.
- Specifying the critical pressures of relevant gas mixtures for appropriate stages (waypoints) of the planned dive profile (gas matching).

Gas planning is one of the stages of scuba gas management. The other stages include:

- Knowledge of personal and team members' gas consumption rates under varying conditions
  - basic consumption at the surface for variations in workload
  - variation in consumption due to depth variation
  - variation in consumption due to dive conditions and personal physical and mental condition
- Monitoring the contents of the cylinders during a dive
- Awareness of the critical pressures and using them to manage the dive
- Efficient use of the available gas during the planned dive and during an emergency
- Limiting the risk of equipment malfunctions that could cause a loss of breathing gas

The term "rock bottom gas planning" is used for the method of gas planning based on a planned dive profile where a reasonably accurate estimate of the depths, times, and level of activity is available, so the calculations for gas mixtures and the appropriate quantities of each mixture are known well enough to make fairly rigorous calculations useful. Simpler, easier, and fairly arbitrary rules of thumb are commonly used for dives which do not require long decompression stops. These methods are often adequate for low risk dives, but relying on them for more complex dive plans can put divers at significantly greater risk if they are unaware of the limitations of each method and apply them inappropriately.

== Choice of breathing gas ==
The choice of breathing gas for scuba diving is from four main groups.

=== Air ===
Air is the default gas for most shallow recreational diving, and in some parts of the world it may be the only gas easily available. It is freely available, consistent in quality and easily compressed. If there were no problems associated with the use of air for deeper and longer dives, there would be no reason to use anything else.

The limitations on the use of air are:

- the effects of nitrogen narcosis at depths greater than about 30 m, but depending on the individual diver.
- limitations on no-decompression stop diving and decompression duration due to solution of nitrogen in the body tissues.

These limitations may be mitigated by the use of gases blended specifically for breathing under pressure.

=== Nitrox ===
In an effort to reduce the decompression problems resulting from the high partial pressures of nitrogen the diver is exposed to when breathing air at depth, oxygen may be added as a substitute for some of the nitrogen. The resulting mixture of nitrogen and oxygen is known as nitrox. The traces of argon and other atmospheric gases are considered to be unimportant.

Nitrox is a mixture of nitrogen and oxygen. Technically this can include air and hypoxic nitrox mixtures, where the gas fraction of oxygen is less than in air (21%), but these are not generally used. Nitrox is generally understood as air enriched by additional oxygen, as that is the usual method for producing it. Gas fraction of oxygen may range from 22% to 99%, but is more usually in the range of 25% to 40% for bottom gas (breathed during the main part of the dive), and 32 to 80% for decompression mixtures.

=== Helium based mixtures ===
Helium is an inert gas which is used in breathing mixtures for diving to reduce or eliminate the narcotic effects of other gases at depth. It is a relatively expensive gas and has some undesirable side effects, and as a result is used where it significantly improves safety. Another desirable feature of helium is low density and low viscosity compared to nitrogen. These properties reduce work of breathing, which can become a limiting factor to the diver at extreme depths.

Undesirable properties of helium as a breathing gas component include highly effective heat transfer, which can chill a diver rapidly, and a tendency to leak more easily and rapidly than other gases. Helium based mixtures should not be used for dry-suit inflation.

Helium is less soluble than nitrogen in body tissues, but as a consequence of its very small molecular weight of 4, compared with 28 for nitrogen, it diffuses faster as is described by Graham's law. Consequently, the tissues saturate faster with helium, but also desaturate faster, provided bubble formation can be avoided. Decompression of saturated tissues will be faster for helium, but unsaturated tissues may take longer or shorter than with nitrogen depending on the dive profile.

Helium is usually mixed with oxygen and air to produce a range of effectively three component gas blends known as Trimixes. Oxygen is limited by toxicity constraints, and nitrogen is limited by acceptable narcotic effects. Helium is used to make up the rest of the mixture, and may also be used to reduce the density to reduce work of breathing.

=== Oxygen ===
Pure oxygen completely eliminates the decompression problem, but is toxic at high partial pressures, which limits its use in diving to shallow depths and as a decompression gas.

100% oxygen is also used to replenish oxygen used by the diver in closed circuit rebreathers, to maintain the set point — the partial pressure of oxygen in the loop that the electronics or diver maintains during the dive. In this case the actual breathing mixture varies with the depth, and is made up of a diluent blend mixed with oxygen. The diluent is usually a gas blend that can be used for bailout if necessary. Relatively small amounts of diluent are used in a rebreather, as the inert components are neither metabolised nor exhausted to the environment while the diver remains at depth, but are rebreathed repetitively, only being lost during ascent, when the gas expands in inverse proportion to the pressure, and must be vented to maintain the correct volume in the loop.

=== Choosing a suitable breathing gas mixture ===
The composition of a breathing gas mixture will depend on its intended use. The mix must be chosen to provide a safe partial pressure of oxygen (PO_{2}) at the working depth. Most dives will use the same mixture for the whole dive, so the composition will be selected to be breathable at all planned depths. There may be decompression considerations. The amount of inert gas that will dissolve in the tissues depends on the partial pressure of the gas its solubility and the time it is breathed at pressure, so the gas may be enriched with oxygen to reduce decompression requirements. The gas must also have a breathable density at the maximum depth intended for its use. A recommended value for maximum density is 6 grams per litre, as higher densities reduce the maximum ventilation rate sufficiently to induce hypercapnia.

Bottom gas
Bottom gas is the term for the gas intended for use during the deepest parts of the dive, and may not be suitable for shallower sectors. Where the maximum depth exceeds the limits for a normoxic breathing gas, a hypoxic mixture should be selected, to control the risk of oxygen toxicity. This may result in a bottom gas composition that will not reliably support consciousness at the surface or at shallow depths, and in this case a travel gas will be needed. Bottom gas is often referred to as back gas as it is usually the gas carried in the back-mounted cylinders, which are the largest capacity scuba set carried in most cases, but the back gas is not necessarily the bottom gas. Occasionally most of the dive will be at a shallower depth, with a short excursion to a greater depth where a different mixture is required. Where a decompression gas is to be carried, the bottom gas can be optimised for the deep sector of the dive.
Bailout gas
A bailout gas is an emergency gas supply carried by the diver to be used if the main gas supply fails. It should be breathable at all planned depths, but as it will not be used at maximum depth for long, can have a slightly higher oxygen fraction than the bottom gas, which could be advantageous during ascent in an emergency. If it is not possible to use a single gas for all depths, two bailout mixtures may be needed. In such cases, there will be a travel gas, which can serve as a second bailout gas, and usually a decompression gas which can be used for bailout at shallower depths. A dedicated bailout gas is not intended to be used during the dive if all goes to plan, but the ability to bail out to a gas with another useful function during the planned dive is more efficient in terms of equipment complexity.
Decompression gas
Decompression gas is the gas intended for use for planned decompression. it is generally chosen to accelerate decompression by providing a relatively high oxygen partial pressure at decompression stops. it can be optimised to minimise total decompression time, or selected from what is already available, and close enough to optimum for practical purposes. If the volume of decompression gas is too much for one cylinder, different mixes may be carried, each optimised for a different depth range of the planned decompression schedule. Although the actual time spent breathing decompression gas may be longer than the bottom time, it is mostly used at much shallower depths, so the amount needed is usually considerably less than the bottom gas. The default decompression gas for a single gas dive is the bottom gas, and where the planned decompression will be short, it may not be worth the cost and task loading to carry a dedicated decompression gas unless it can also function as a bailout gas.
Travel gas
A travel gas is a gas mixture which is intended to be used during descent in the depth range where the bottom gas is unsuitable. If a hypoxic bottom gas is required it may not reliably support consciousness at the surface or at shallow depths, and in this case a travel gas will be needed to get through the hypoxic depth range. The travel gas may also be used during ascent, where it will serve as a decompression gas.

=== Calculating the composition ===
Henry's law states:

At a given temperature, the amount of gas that can dissolve in a fluid is directly proportional to the partial pressure of the gas.

On short duration dives the P_{O_{2}} can be raised to 1.2 to 1.6 bar. This reduces the P_{N_{2}} and/or P_{He}, and will shorten the required decompression for a given profile.

Breathing air deeper than 30 metres (100 ft) (pressure > 4 bar) has a significant narcotic effect on the diver. As helium has no narcotic effect, this can be avoided by adding helium to the mixture so that the partial pressure of narcotic gases remains below a debilitating level. This varies depending on the diver, and there is significant cost in helium mixtures, but the increased safety and efficiency of work resulting from helium use can be worth the cost. The other disadvantage of helium based mixtures is the increased cooling of the diver. Dry suits should not be inflated with helium-rich mixtures.

Apart from helium, and probably neon, all gases that can be breathed have a narcotic effect which increases with raised partial pressure, with oxygen suspected to have a narcotic effect comparable to that of nitrogen, though the evidence is inconclusive.

Example: Choose a gas mixture suitable for a bounce dive to 50 metres, where P_{O_{2}} must be limited to 1.4 bar and equivalent narcotic depth to 30 metres:

Pressure at 50 m depth = 6 bar
Required P_{O_{2}} = 1.4 bar : Oxygen fraction F_{O_{2}} = 1.4/6 = 0.23 = 23%
Required equivalent narcotic depth (END) = 30 m
Equivalent air pressure at 30 m = 4 bar
PHe at 50 m on the mix must therefore be (6 − 4) bar = 2 bar, so F_{He} is 2/6 = 0.333 = 33%
The remaining (100–(33+23)) = 44% would be nitrogen
The resulting mixture is a trimix 23/33 (23% oxygen, 33% helium, balance nitrogen)

These are optimum values for minimizing decompression and helium cost. A lower fraction of oxygen would be acceptable, but would be a disadvantage for decompression, and a higher fraction of helium would be acceptable but cost more.

The gas can be checked for density at maximum depth as this can have a significant effect on the work of breathing. An excessive work of breathing will reduce the diver's reserve capacity to deal with a possible emergency if physical exertion is required. A preferred maximum gas density of 5.2 g/L and a maximum gas density of 6.2 g/L are recommended by Anthony and Mitchell.

The calculation is similar to calculation of mass of gas in the cylinders.

== Choice of scuba configuration ==
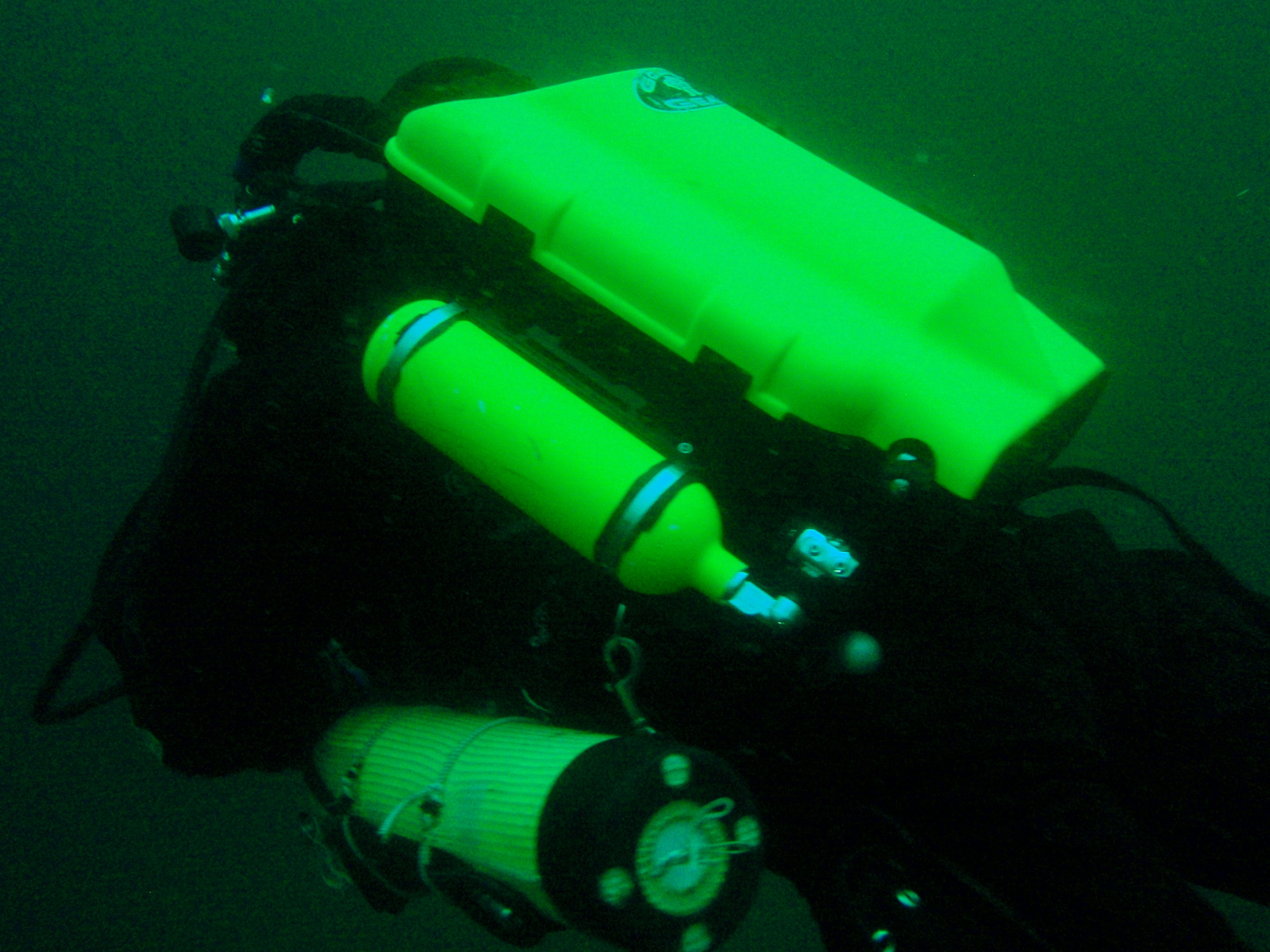
Rebreathers recirculate the breathing gas after removing the carbon dioxide and compensating for oxygen used. This allows considerably lower gas consumption at the cost of complexity

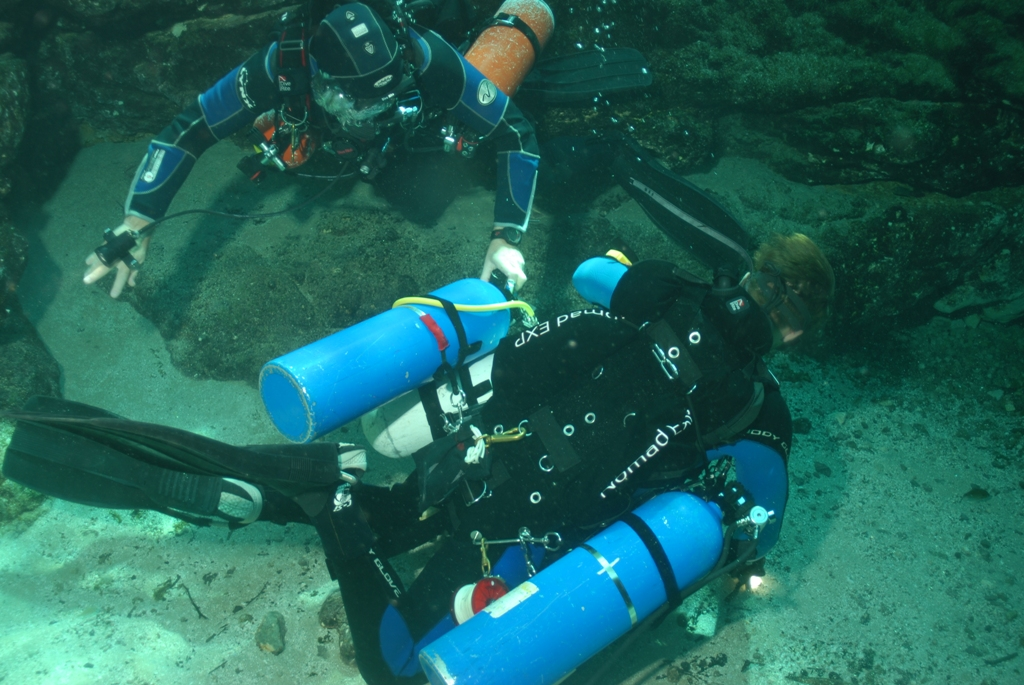
Side mounting systems carry the cylinders at the diver's sides

=== Open circuit vs. rebreather ===
The amount of gas needed on a dive depends on whether the scuba equipment to be used is open, semi-closed or closed circuit. Open circuit diving exhausts all respired gas to the surroundings, regardless of how much has been useful to the diver, whereas a semi-closed or closed circuit system retains most of the respired gas, and restores it to a respirable condition by removing the waste product carbon dioxide, and making up the oxygen content to a suitable partial pressure. Closed and semi-closed circuit scuba sets are also known as rebreathers.

=== Back mount vs. side mount ===
Another aspect of scuba configuration is how the primary cylinders are carried by the diver. The two basic arrangements are back mount and side mount.

Back mount is the system where one or more cylinders are firmly attached to a harness, usually with a buoyancy compensator jacket or wing, and carried on the diver's back. Back mount allows cylinders to be manifolded together as twins, or for special circumstances, trips or quads. It is a high-profile arrangement and may be unsuited to some sites where the diver needs to pass through low openings. This is the standard configuration for single or twin cylinder recreational diving, and for much technical diving in open water.

Side mounting suspends the primary cylinders from the harness at the diver's sides: usually two cylinders of approximately equal size would be used. Additional decompression cylinders may be attached in a similar way. The method of carrying cylinders suspended at the sides of the harness known as sling mounting is similar and differs in detail.

=== Cylinders for decompression or bailout ===
The commonly used configurations for multiple cylinders are to either carry the bottom gas in back-mounted cylinders of sufficient total volume, either manifolded or independent, and the other mixes in sling-mounts clipped off to the sides of the diver's harness on D-rings, or to carry all gases in side-mounted cylinders. Decompression gas, when different from the gas used for the main part of the dive, is commonly carried in one or more cylinders suspended from the side of the diver's harness by clips. Multiple cylinders may be carried this way for extreme dives.

Sidemount harnesses require the cylinders to be carried individually clipped to the harness at the sides of the diver. Skilled sidemount exponents can carry 6 aluminum 80 cylinders this way, 3 each side.

The diver must be able to positively identify the gas supplied by any one of the several demand valves that these configurations require, to avoid potentially fatal problems of oxygen toxicity, hypoxia, nitrogen narcosis or divergence from the decompression plan which may occur if an inappropriate gas is used. One of the conventions puts the oxygen rich gases to the right, Other methods include labelling by content and/or maximum operating depth (MOD), and identification by touch. Often several or all of these methods are used together.

Bailout gas for a back-mounted configuration may be carried in a variety of ways in a bailout cylinder. The most popular being as a sling cylinder, a pony cylinder strapped to the primary back mounted cylinder, or in a small cylinder (Spare air) supported by a pocket attached to the buoyancy compensator. When more than one cylinder of the same mix are side-mounted, the cylinders not in use function as bailout sets, provided they contain enough gas to get the diver safely to the surface.

=== Drop cylinders ===
If the route of the dive is constrained or can be reliably planned, cylinders for bailout of decompression gas can be dropped along the route at the points where they will be needed on the return or ascent. The cylinders are usually clipped to a distance line or shot line, to ensure that they are easy to find and unlikely to get lost. These cylinders would typically contain a gas mixture close to optimal for the sector of the dive in which they are intended to be used. This procedure is also known as staging, and the cylinders then known as stage cylinders, but the term stage cylinder has become generic for any cylinder carried at the diver's side in addition to the bottom gas. Gas redundancy protocols should be applied to drop cylinders just like for any other breathing gas supply.

== Quantity of open circuit breathing gas ==
The formal and relatively complete procedure for scuba gas planning assumes that a dive plan is available that is sufficiently detailed that most of the variables are known. many recreational dives are conducted on a more ad hoc basis where the dive is planned and conducted around the available gas.

The quantity of gas needed for a planned dive comprises the calculated quantity of gas for consumption on the planned profile and additional gas intended for contingencies, also known as the reserve gas.

== Turn pressure ==
Turn pressure is the remaining gas pressure at which the dive will be turned, and either the exit from a penetration dive or the ascent will be started. Turn pressure usually refers to the bottom gas, but can also be based on the pressure in other cylinders if the supply of that gas is critical.

=== Arbitrary turn pressure ===
The majority of recreational divers do not do penetration dives or dives exceeding the no-decompression limit, and can safely ascend directly to the surface at any point of a dive. Such ascents do not use a large volume of gas, and these divers are commonly taught to start the ascent at a given remaining pressure in the cylinder, regardless of the depth, size of cylinder, or breathing rate expected, mainly because it is easy to remember and makes the dive leader's work simpler on group dives. The method originated in the non-adjustable reserve pressure cutoff provided by mechanical reserve cylinder valves which were in general use before the submersible pressure gauge became a standard component of the scuba set. It may occasionally be insufficiently conservative, but is more often unnecessarily conservative, particularly on shallow dives with a large cylinder. Divers may be told to notify the dive leader at 80 or 100 bar and to return to the boat with not less than 50 bar or 700 psi or something similar remaining, but one of the reasons for having the 50 bar in reserve is to make the return to the boat safer, by allowing the diver to swim on the surface in choppy water while breathing off the regulator. This residual gas may also be well used for an extended or additional safety stop when the dive approached the no decompression limit, but it is good practice not to entirely use up the gas if it can safely be avoided, as an empty cylinder is easier to contaminate during handling, and the filling operator may be required to have any cylinder which does not register a residual pressure when presented for filling internally inspected to ensure that it has not been contaminated by water ingress.

=== Rule of thirds ===
The rule of thirds is another such rule of thumb. The basic rule generally only applies to diving in overhead environments, such as caves and wrecks, where a direct ascent to the surface is impossible and the divers must return the way they came, and no decompression stops are intended. If decompression is planned, the rule of thirds may be applied additional to decompression gas requirements.

For divers following this rule, one third of the gas supply is used for the outward journey, one third for the return journey and one third is held in reserve in case of an emergency. The dive is turned when the first diver reaches one third of the starting pressure. However, when diving with a buddy with a higher breathing rate or a different volume of gas, it may be necessary to set one third of the buddy's gas supply as the remaining 'third'. This means that the turn point to exit is earlier, or that the diver with the lower breathing rate carries a larger volume of gas than would be required if both had the same breathing rate.

Reserves are needed at the end of dives in case the diver has gone deeper or longer than planned and must remain underwater to do decompression stops before being able to ascend safely to the surface. A diver without gas cannot do the stops and risks decompression sickness.

In an overhead environment, where it is not possible to ascend directly to the surface, the reserve allows the diver to donate gas to an out-of-gas buddy, providing enough gas to let both divers exit the enclosure and ascend to the surface.

=== Half + 15 bar ===
A different option for penetration dives is the "half + 15 bar" (half + 200 psi) method, in which the contingency gas for the stage is carried in the primary cylinders. Some divers consider this method to be the most conservative when multi-staging. If all goes to plan when using this method, the divers surface with stages nearly empty, but with all the contingency gas still in their primary cylinders. With a single stage drop, this means the primary cylinders will still be about half-full.

=== Rock bottom gas quantity calculations (metric system) ===
"Rock bottom gas planning" refers to the methods of scuba gas quantity calculation based on a planned dive profile where a reasonably accurate estimate of the depths, times, and level of activity expected for each stage of the dive is available, so fairly rigorous calculations for gas mixtures and the appropriate quantities of each mixture are useful. Gas consumption depends on the ambient pressure, the breathing rate, and the duration of the dive sector under those conditions.

Ambient pressure is a direct function of the depth. It is atmospheric pressure at the surface, plus hydrostatic pressure, at 1 bar per 10 m depth.

==== Respiratory minute volume ====
Respiratory minute volume (RMV) is the volume of gas that is breathed by a diver in a minute. For a working commercial diver IMCA suggests RMV = 35 L/min. For emergencies IMCA suggests RMV = 40 L/min Decompression RMV is usually less as the diver is not generally working hard. IMCA, however, does not approve of the use of scuba for commercial diving, so these figures are intended for use with scuba replacement equipment with surface supplied demand helmets and full-face masks, where the diver does not have to carry the primary breathing gas cylinders. Smaller values can be used for estimating dive times, The diver can use measured values for themself, but worst case values should be used to calculate critical pressures for turnaround or ascent and for rescue, as the RMV of a diver will usually increase with stress or exertion. Some divers calculate personal dive factors which are reasonably consistent values for multiples of resting gas consumption for different levels of work, such as decompressing, relaxed diving, sustained swimming, hard work etc. These factors can be used to estimate RMV.

==== Gas consumption rate ====
Gas consumption rate (Q) on open circuit depends on absolute ambient pressure (P_{a}) and RMV.

Gas consumption rate: Q = P_{a} × RMV (litres per minute)

==== Available gas ====
The available volume of gas in a cylinder is the volume which may be used before reaching a critical pressure, generally known as the reserve. The value chosen for reserve should be sufficient for the diver to make a safe ascent in sub-optimal conditions. It may require supply of gas to a second diver (buddy breathing) Available gas may be corrected to surface pressure, or specified at a given depth pressure.

Available gas at ambient pressure:

V_{available} = V_{set} × (P_{start} − P_{reserve})/P_{ambient}

Where:

V_{set} = volume of the cylinder set = sum of the volumes of the manifolded cylinders
P_{start} = Starting pressure of the cylinder set
P_{reserve} = Reserve pressure
P_{ambient} = ambient pressure

In the case of surface pressure: P_{ambient} = 1 bar and the formula simplifies to:

Available gas at surface pressure: V_{available} = V_{set} × (P_{start} − P_{reserve})

==== Available time ====
The time a diver can work on the available gas (also called endurance) is:

Available time = Available gas / RMV

The Available gas and the RMV must both be correct for the depth, or both corrected to surface pressure.

==== Estimation of gas requirement for a dive sector ====
Calculation of gas requirement for a dive can be broken up into simpler estimates for gas requirement for sectors of the dive, and then added together to indicate the requirement for the entire dive.

A dive sector should be at a constant depth, or an average depth can be estimated. This is used to get the sector ambient pressure (P_{sector}). The duration of the sector (T_{sector}) and RMV of the diver for the sector (RMV_{sector}) must also be estimated. If the sector gas volume requirements (V_{sector}) are all calculated at surface pressure, they can later be added directly. This reduces the risk of confusion and error.

Once these values have been chosen they are substituted in the formula:

V_{sector} = RMV_{sector} × P_{sector} × T_{sector}

This is the free volume of the gas at atmospheric pressure. The pressure change (δP_{cyl}) in the cylinder used to store this gas depends on the internal volume of the cylinder (V_{cyl}), and is calculated using Boyle's law:

δP_{cyl} = V_{sector} × P_{atm}/V_{cyl} (P_{atm} - 1 bar)

==== Minimum functional pressure ====
Breathing gas regulators will work efficiently down to a cylinder pressure slightly above the designed interstage pressure. This pressure may be called minimum functional cylinder pressure. It will vary with depth as the nominal interstage pressure is additional to the ambient pressure.

This does not mean that all the remaining gas is unobtainable from a cylinder; rather that the regulator will deliver some of it less efficiently than the designed work of breathing, and the rest only when the ambient pressure is reduced. In most regulator designs the diver will have to overcome a larger cracking pressure to open the demand valve, and flow rate will be reduced. These effects increase as the interstage pressure decreases. This can provide the diver with a warning that gas supply from that cylinder will immanently cease. However, in at least one regulator design, once the interstage pressure has been sufficiently reduced, the inflatable second stage servo-valve will deflate and effectively lock open the demand valve, allowing the residual gas to escape until the cylinder pressure has dropped to approximately equal the ambient pressure, at which point flow will stop until the ambient pressure is reduced by ascending to shallower depth.

A value of 10 bar interstage pressure plus ambient pressure is a suitable estimate for minimum functional pressure for most planning purposes. This value will vary with the depth, and a regulator that has stopped delivering breathing gas may deliver a little more gas as the ambient pressure decreases, allowing a few more breaths from the cylinder during ascent if the gas is used up during the dive. The amount of gas available in this way depends on the internal volume of the cylinder.

==== Critical pressures ====
Critical pressures (P_{critical} or P_{crit}) are pressures that must not be dropped below during a given part of a planned dive as they provide gas for emergencies.

Reserve pressure is an example of a critical pressure. This is also known as critical pressure of ascent, or minimum gas as this indicates the amount of gas required to safely ascend with allowances for specific contingencies listed in the dive plan.

Critical pressures may also be specified for the start of the dive and for turnaround where direct ascent is not possible or not desirable. These can be called critical pressure of descent or critical pressure for the dive profile, and critical pressure of exit or critical pressure of turnaround.

==== Calculation of critical pressures ====
Critical pressures are calculated by adding up all the volumes of gas required for the parts of the dive after the critical point, and for other functions such as suit inflation and buoyancy control if these are supplied from the same set of cylinders, and dividing this total volume by the volume of the cylinder set. A minimum functional pressure is added to this value to give the critical pressure.

Example: Critical pressure of descent:

Gas required for descent		175	litres
Gas required for buoyancy control	+	50	litres
Gas required for bottom sector	+	2625	litres
Gas required for ascent	+	350	litres
Gas required for decompression stops	+	525	litres
Gas required to inflate BC on surface	+	20	litres
Total gas usage planned for dive		3745	litres
÷ Volume of set (2 x 12 litres)	÷	24	litres
Pressure required to provide gas		156	bar
+ Minimum functional pressure	+	20	bar
Critical pressure of descent		176	bar

This dive should not be attempted if less than 176 bar is available. Note that no allowance has been made for contingencies.

=== Effect of temperature change on pressure ===
The temperature of the gas should be taken into account when checking critical pressures.

Critical pressures for ascent or turnaround will be measured at ambient temperature and do not require compensation, but critical pressure for descent may be measured at a temperature considerably higher than the temperature at depth.

Pressure should be corrected to the expected water temperature using Gay-Lussac's law.

P_{2} = P_{1} × (T_{2}/T_{1})

Example: Pressure correction for temperature: The cylinders are at about 30°C, water temperature is 10°C, critical pressure for descent (P_{1}) is 176 bar at 10°C

Cylinder temperature (T_{1})	= 30 + 273	= 303 K (convert temperatures to absolute: T(K)= T(°C)+273)
Water temperature (T_{2})	= 10 + 273	= 283 K
Critical pressure at 30°C (P_{2})	= 176 x (303/283)	= 188 bar

=== Estimating gas quantities for contingencies ===
The basic problem with estimating a gas allowance for contingencies is to decide what contingencies to allow for. This is addressed in the risk assessment for the planned dive. A commonly considered contingency is to share gas with another diver from the point in the dive where the maximum time is needed to reach the surface or other place where more gas is available. It is likely that both divers will have a higher than normal RMV during an assisted ascent as it is a stressful situation, and it is prudent to take this into account. For occupational divers the values should be chosen according to recommendations of the code of practice in use, but if a higher value is chosen it is unlikely that anyone would object. Recreational divers are advised by the training agencies to use values which the agency considers appropriate and unlikely to lead to litigation, which are generally conservative and based on published experimental data, but the divers may have the discretion to use RMV values of their own choice, based on personal experience and informed acceptance of risk.

The procedure is identical to that for any other multi-sector gas consumption calculation, except that two divers are involved, doubling the effective RMV.

To check whether the bail-out cylinder has adequate gas (for one diver) in case of an emergency at the planned depth, critical pressure should be calculated based on the planned profile and should allow change-over, ascent and all planned decompression.

Example: Emergency gas supply:

A dive is planned to 30 m which requires 6 minutes decompression at 3 m. For emergencies IMCA recommends assuming RMV = 40 L/min

Allow change-over time at working depth			=	2	minutes
Pressure during change-over	=	30/10+1	=	4	bar
Gas consumption during change-over	=	40 x 4 x 2	=	320	litres
Ascent time from 30m at 10m/min			=	3	minutes
Average pressure during ascent	=	15/10+1	=	2.5	bar
Gas consumption during ascent	=	40 x 2.5 x 3	=	300	litres
Decompression stop for 6 minutes at 3 m
Pressure during stop	=	3/10 + 1	=	1.3	bar
Gas consumption at stop	=	40 x 1.3 x 6	=	312	litres
Total gas consumption	=	320+300+312	=	932	litres
A 10-litre cylinder is available:
Pressure of 932 litres of gas in 10-litre cylinder			=	93.2	bar
Allow 10 bar minimum functional pressure for regulator:
Critical pressure for bailout gas	=	93.2 + 10	=	103	bar

=== Gas matching ===
Gas matching is the calculation of reserve and turn pressures for divers using different cylinder volumes or with different gas consumption rates on the same dive, allowing each diver to ensure that sufficient gas is retained to allow for foreseeable contingencies where divers may need to share gas, based on each diver's cylinder volumes, and both divers' individual gas consumption rates.

It is standard practice to turn the dive immediately on starting emergency gas sharing, so matched gas volumes only apply from the turning point. Up to that point only the diver's own consumption under the expected conditions need be considered.

== Gas quantities for rebreathers ==
The gas requirements for a closed circuit rebreather are very different to open circuit. Oxygen consumption is independent of depth, and is controlled by metabolic work rate, which is largely limited by work of breathing and gas density. There is another limit on the amount of oxygen that can be usefully carried, in that the endurance of a rebreather is limited by the amount of carbon dioxide that the scrubber can absorb before breakthrough, and the amount of carbon dioxide produced by the diver is very closely related by the respiratory exchange ratio to the amount of oxygen metabolised.

Diluent gas use is closely linked to depth variation, as it must be added to maintain loop volume when descending, and is vented to the surroundings and lost when ascending. When the diver is at constant depth, diluent usage is very low, and is restricted to diluent flushes to check oxygen sensor calibration, and bailout to open circuit, at which point it will be used at the same rate as open circuit breathing gas.

In semi-closed rebreathers, there are two basic ways that gas is used:

- An active addition system using constant mass flow injection will use gas at a constant rate independent of depth, exertion, or breathing rate during descent, except when flushing the loop or adding gas to maintain loop volume. Endurance is mainly a function of cylinder content and orifice size.
- A concentric bellows counterlung passive addition system adds gas when the counterlung is empty, and exhausts a proportion of the exhaled volume on each breath, so gas consumption is proportional to depth and breathing rate. This is similar to open circuit consumption, but at a lower rate, proportional to the discharge ratio.

== Selection of appropriate cylinders ==
=== Number ===
The fundamental decision in choice of cylinders is whether the entire gas supply for the dive is to be carried in one set, or is to be divided into more than one set for different parts of the dive. Diving with a single cylinder is logistically simple, and makes all the gas available for breathing throughout the dive, but can not take advantage of optimising the breathing gas for decompression, or having an independent emergency supply that does not rely on the presence of a dive buddy where and when needed. A single cylinder puts the diver in a position of dependence on the buddy for alternative breathing gas in case of an emergency cutting off the main air supply, unless the option of a free ascent is acceptable.

Diving with multiple cylinders is done for three basic procedural reasons, or a combination of the three.

1. A fully independent supply of breathing gas is provided for emergencies where the primary gas supply is interrupted. This is generally termed bailout gas, and may be carried in a bailout cylinder, which may be a pony cylinder, or the primary gas supply may be split and carried in two (or more) similarly sized independent primary cylinders.
2. Gas mixtures optimised for accelerated decompression may be carried. Typically these gases are not suitable for breathing at maximum dive depth due to excessive oxygen fraction for the depth, so are not ideal for bailout from maximum depth.
3. The bottom gas may be hypoxic and unsuitable for breathing at the surface. A travel gas may be used to transit the hypoxic range. It may be possible to use one of the decompression mixtures as a travel gas, which would reduce the number of cylinders carried.

Deep open circuit technical dives may require a combination of bottom gas, travel gas and two or more different decompression gases, which poses a challenge to the diver of how to carry them all and use them correctly, as misuse of a gas in an inappropriate depth range can lead to hypoxia or oxygen toxicity, and will also affect decompression obligations.

A fourth, logistical reason, is availability of cylinders of suitable capacity. The largest capacity cylinders in general use for scuba diving are 18 litre 232 bar steel cylinders, and they are relatively uncommon. Multiple cylinders may be chosen simply to provide sufficient capacity for the planned profile and specific gas.

=== Volume ===
Each gas must be provided in sufficient quantity to adequately supply the diver throughout the relevant sector(s) of the dive. This is done by selecting a cylinder or cylinders which when filled can contain at least the required amount of gas, including any relevant reserve and contingency allowance, above the minimum functional pressure at the depth where the gas will last be used. Buoyancy and trim consequences of the tank choice should be considered, both as a consequence of the inherent buoyancy characteristics of the cylinder complete with regulator and other accessories, and due to the use of the contents during the dive.

=== Material ===
The material and pressure rating of cylinders affects convenience, ergonomics and safety. Buoyancy control is easier, more stable, and safer when the gas volume needed to achieve neutral buoyancy is minimised, particularly at the end of a dive during ascent and decompression when total gas mass is at a minimum. The need for a large volume of gas in the buoyancy compensator during ascent increases risk of an uncontrolled ascent during decompression.

The commonly available materials are aluminium alloy and steel. Short high-pressure steel cylinders may be quite negatively buoyant, while long aluminium cylinders may be close to neutral when full, and buoyant when empty. Back gas cylinders that are negatively buoyant to a moderate extent can reduce the overall weight carried by the diver, so it can be an advantage to use steel, even at the higher pressure rating of 300 bar, as long as this does not overwhelm the buoyancy of the other equipment with the buoyancy compensator empty. The need for buoyancy compensator inflation to achieve neutral buoyancy when all cylinders are empty and no ditchable weights are worn indicates that the selection is unsafe, as it would be necessary to ditch breathing gas to regain buoyancy in the event of a buoyancy compensator failure.

Cylinders that are buoyant when full require ballasting to make them manageable underwater. These are usually fibre wound composite cylinders, which are also expensive, relatively easy to damage, and usually have a shorter service life, but may be useful for dives where access to the water is unusually difficult, such as deep in caves or at high altitude, when cylinders for multiple dives must be provided.

Cylinders that are intended to be stage dropped or handed off to another diver must be negative when dropped, to prevent them from floating away, and should be close to neutral so that the diver's buoyancy is not changed more than necessary when they are dropped, and it must be possible to achieve and maintain neutral buoyancy throughout the dive until decompression is completed and all breathing gas used up.

== Buoyancy variations during the dive ==
The diver must carry sufficient weight to remain neutral at the shallowest decompression stop until all the gas has been used. This is a severe contingency scenario, as something would have gone wrong for all the gas to have been used, but not being able to stay down to use the last of the gas when it is necessary would be even worse, and it would be pointless to carry gas that cannot be used. This requires the diver to be negatively buoyant by the total mass of gas carried at the start of the dive with an empty buoyancy compensator, so the buoyancy compensator must have sufficient volume to neutralise this excess and any further loss of buoyancy in the diving suit during the descent. Calculation of the required weight and buoyancy volume to compensate for gas use can be done if the mass of the stored gas is known. Compensation for wetsuit buoyancy loss is a bit more complex and depends on the type and thickness of neoprene and surface area of the suit, and is best determined by experiment. Dry suit buoyancy loss can, and normally should, be corrected by inflation during the descent.

=== Calculation of the mass of gas in the cylinders ===
A simple method for calculating the mass of a volume of gas is to calculate its mass at STP, at which densities for gases are readily available. The mass of each component of a gas is calculated for the volume of that component, using the gas fraction for that component.

Gas	Density	Condition
Air	1.2754 kg/m^{3}	0°C, 1.01325 bar
Helium	0.1786 kg/m^{3}	0°C, 1.01325 bar
Nitrogen	1.251 kg/m^{3}	0°C, 1.01325 bar
Oxygen	1.429 kg/m^{3}	0°C, 1.01325 bar

Example: Twin 12l cylinders filled with Trimix 20/30/50 to 232 bar at 20°C (293K)

Calculate volume at 1.013 bar, 0%deg;C (273K)

V_{1}	=	12 litres per cylinder × 2 cylinders	=	24	litres
V_{2}	=	(24 litres × 232 bar × 273K) / (1.013 bar × 293K)	=	5121	litres

Of this,

20% is oxygen	=	0.2 × 5496	=	1024 litres	=	1.024 m^{3}
Mass of oxygen	=	1.429 kg/m^{3}	×	1.024 m^{3}			=	1.464 kg
30% is helium	=	0.3 × 5121	=	1536 litres	=	1.536 m^{3}
Mass of helium	=	0.1786 kg/m^{3}	×	1.536 m^{3}			=	0.274 kg
50% is nitrogen	=	0.5 × 5121	=	2561 litres	=	2.561 m^{3}
Mass of nitrogen	=	1.251 kg/m^{3}	×	2.561 m^{3}			=	3.203 kg
Total mass of gas	mixture						=	4.941 kg

The mass of the helium is a small part of the total. and density of oxygen and nitrogen are fairly similar. A reasonable approximation is to use the volume at 20 °C, ignore the mass of helium and take all nitrox and air components to be 1.3 kg/m^{3}.

Using these approximations the estimate for the previous example is:
Mass of mixture = 0.7 × 0.024m^{3}/bar × 232 bar × 1.3 kg/m^{3} = 5.1 kg
This method will seldom be out by as much as a kg, which is close enough for buoyancy estimates for most open circuit scuba mixes.

== Calculation of density of the bottom mix ==
Calculation of density is quite straightforward. The gas fraction is multiplied by the free gas density for each gas, and summed, then multiplied by the absolute pressure.

Example: Trimix 20/30/50 at 0°C

Oxygen: 0.2 × 1.429 kg/m^{3} = 0.2858
Helium: 0.3 × 0.1786 kg/m^{3} = 0.05358
Nitrogen: 0.5 × 1.251 kg/m^{3} = 0.6255
Mixture: 0.96488 kg/m^{3}

If this is to be used at 50 msw, absolute pressure can be taken as 6 bar, and density will be 6 × 0.96488 = 5.78 kg/m^{3} This is less than the upper limit of 6.2 kg/m^{3} recommended by Anthony and Mitchell, but more than their preferred limit of 5.2 kg/m^{3}

== See also ==
- Alternative air source – Emergency supply of breathing gas for an underwater diver
- Bailout cylinder – Emergency gas supply cylinder carried by a diver
- Dive planning – Process of planning an underwater diving operation
- Rule of thirds (diving) – Rule of thumb for scuba gas management
