= Rule of thirds (diving) =

Rule of thumb for scuba gas management

In scuba diving, the rule of thirds is a rule of thumb used by divers to plan dives so they have enough breathing gas remaining in their diving cylinder at the end of the dive to be able to complete the dive safely. This rule generally only applies to diving in overhead environments, such as caves, wrecks, and ice diving, where a direct ascent to the surface is impossible and the divers must return the way they came.

For divers following the rule, one third of the gas supply is planned for the outward journey, one third is for the return journey and one third is a safety reserve. However, when diving with a buddy with a higher breathing rate or a different volume of gas, it may be necessary to set one third of the buddy's gas supply as the remaining 'third'. This means that the turn point to exit is earlier, or that the diver with the lower breathing rate carries a larger volume of gas than they alone require.

Reserves are needed at the end of dives in case the diver has gone deeper or longer than planned and must remain underwater to do decompression stops before being able to ascend safely to the surface. A diver without gas cannot do the stops and risks decompression sickness. In an overhead environment, where it is not possible to ascend directly to the surface, the reserve allows the diver to donate gas to an out-of-gas buddy, providing enough gas to let both divers exit the enclosure and ascend to the surface.

By the rule of thirds system the gas in stage cylinders is managed in the same way as the primary supply, whether the primary is carried as back gas or sidemounted. A third of the gas in the stage cylinder is used before the drop, leaving two thirds in the cylinder, the minimum amount for two divers to exit on one cylinder. The cylinder may be carried a few minutes beyond the point at which the first third was used, but is not breathed for this extra distance, to conserve the gas for the return, as this allows it to be reached a bit earlier if one diver loses all gas at the end of the next stage when gas supply is at critical pressure. If all goes to plan, the divers will surface with stages and primary cylinders each containing about one third of the original content.

With the rule of thirds, the duration of the dive is limited by the point at which the gas reaches 1/3 the starting quantity, by not exceeding the planned decompression obligation, and by returning along the same route in similar conditions. Where a more specific or varied dive profile is planned, the "rock bottom" gas planning procedure is more versatile but more complex to calculate. Other rules of thumb for scuba gas planning exist and may be used where appropriate.

== See also ==
- Cave diving – Diving in water-filled caves
- Dive planning – The process of planning an underwater diving operation
- Half + 15 bar – Rule of thumb for scuba gas management
- Penetration diving – Diving under a physical barrier to a direct vertical ascent to the surface
- Scuba gas management – Logistical aspects of scuba breathing gas
- Scuba gas planning – Estimation of breathing gas mixtures and quantities required for a planned dive profile
- Scuba skills – The skills required to dive safely using a self-contained underwater breathing apparatus.
- Sheck Exley – American cave and deep diving pioneer and record breaker
