= Transmural =

Transmural denotes something across a wall or other equivalent:

- Transmural care is the interface between primary and secondary care in medicine
- Transmural pressure (disambiguation), is change in pressure between two separated compartments
