= Transpulmonary pressure =

Transpulmonary pressure is the difference between the alveolar pressure and the intrapleural pressure in the pleural cavity. During human ventilation, air flows because of pressure gradients.

P_{tp} = P_{alv} – P_{ip}

Where P_{tp} is transpulmonary pressure, P_{alv} is alveolar pressure, and P_{ip} is intrapleural pressure.

== Physiology ==
Since atmospheric pressure is relatively constant, pressure in the lungs must be higher or lower than atmospheric pressure for air to flow between the atmosphere and the alveoli. If 'transpulmonary pressure' = 0 (alveolar pressure = intrapleural pressure), such as when the lungs are removed from the chest cavity or air enters the intrapleural space (a pneumothorax), the lungs collapse as a result of their inherent elastic recoil. Under physiological conditions the transpulmonary pressure is always positive; intrapleural pressure is always negative and relatively large, while alveolar pressure moves from slightly negative to slightly positive as a person breathes. For a given lung volume, the transpulmonary pressure is equal and opposite to the elastic recoil pressure of the lung.

The transpulmonary pressure vs volume curve of inhalation (usually plotted as volume as a function of pressure) is different from that of exhalation, the difference being described as hysteresis. Lung volume at any given pressure during inhalation is less than the lung volume at any given pressure during exhalation.

== Measurement ==
Transpulmonary pressure can be measured by placing pressure transducers. The alveolar pressure is estimated by measuring the pressure in the airways while holding one's breath. The intrapleural pressure is estimated by measuring the pressure inside a balloon placed in the esophagus.

Measurement of transpulmonary pressure assists in spirometry in availing for calculation of static lung compliance.
