= Transmural pressure =

Transmural pressure is the difference in pressure between two sides of a wall or equivalent separator. According to myogenic theory smooth muscle contract in response to increased transmural pressure and relax to decreased transmural pressure

- For body vasculature or other hollow organs, see Smooth muscle#External substances
- For lungs, see Transpulmonary pressure
