= Alveolar pressure =

Air pressure inside lung alveoli

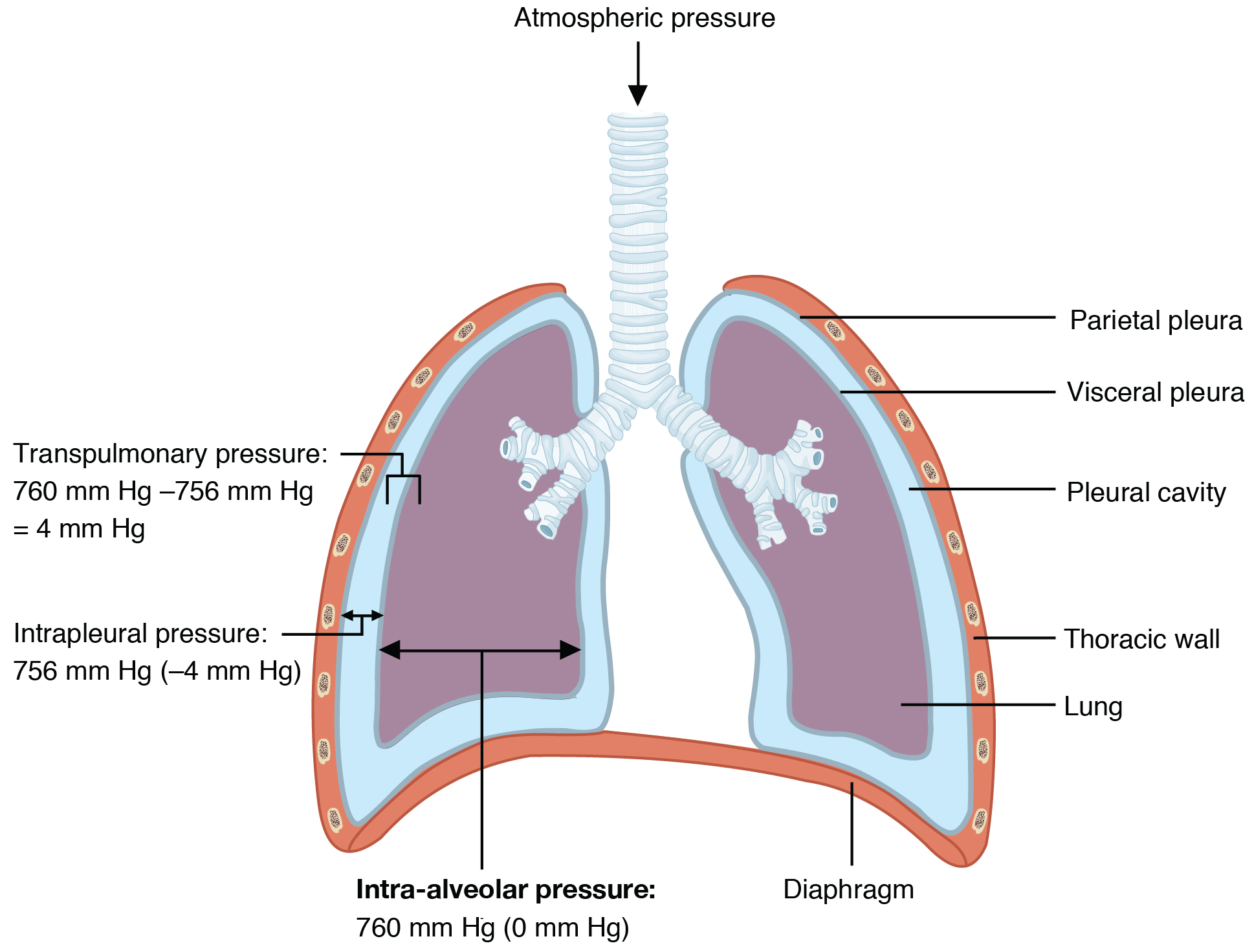
Image illustrating transpulmonary, intrapleural and intra-alveolar pressure

Alveolar pressure (P_{alv}) is the pressure of air inside the lung alveoli. When the glottis is opened and no air is flowing into or out of the lungs, alveolar pressure is equal to the atmospheric pressure.

Alveolar pressure can be deduced from plethysmography.

== Physiology ==
=== Changes during respiration ===
During inhalation, the increased volume of alveoli as a result of lung expansion decreases the intra-alveolar pressure to a value below atmospheric pressure about -1 cmH_{2}O. This slight negative pressure is enough to move 500 mL of air into the lungs in the 2 seconds required for inspiration. At the end of inspiration, the alveolar pressure returns to atmospheric pressure (0 cmH_{2}O).

During exhalation, the opposite change occurs. The lung alveoli collapse before air is expelled from them. The alveolar pressure rises to about +1 cmH_{2}O. 500 mL of air is expired in 2–3 seconds of expiration. By the end of expiration, the pressure drops gradually and becomes atmospheric again.

Changes of alveolar pressure are determined by flow rate and airway resistance. While the alveolar pressure change amounts to only about Δ1 cmH_{2}O or so during normal respiration, it may be many times greaters in subjects with airway obstruction.

=== Vascular effects ===
==== Transmural pressure ====
Alveolar pressure exerts pressure upon the pulmonary capillaries which are consequently liable to either distend and collapse. Whether this happens depends upon transmural pressure which is determined by blood pressure within the vessels which exerts a countervailing force. Deep inspiration is associated with distension of the alveolar walls which stretches the pulmonary capillaries, decreasing their caliber and thus increasing their resistance; this is coupled with concurrent distension of the heart by the decreased intrapleural pressure which causes blood pressure to decrease. Alveolar pressure therefore influences the vascular resistance of these vessels. Alveolar pressure is typically the effective pressure exerted upon the capillaries, though pulmonary surfactant may additionally act to reduce the effective pressure under special circumstances.

Somewhat larger alveolar blood vessels at the margins of the alveolar walls are also subject to rather de effects alveolar pressure. the larger, extra-pulmonary vessels are however subject to distinct mechanical forces - these vessels are instead distended by radial traction of the elastic lung parenchyma during inspiration.

==== Effects on alveolar perfusion ====
Due to the hydrostatic properties of blood, the pressure difference between the top and the bottom of the lung in an upright subject amounts to 22 mmHg (300 mmH_{2}O). Normally, pulmonary capillary pressure is just high enough to maintain some blood flow through all capillaries including those in the upper-most parts of lung, but if alveolar pressure exceeds capillary arterial pressure, capillaries collapse here, causing blood flow to cease completely. This may happen if arterial pressure falls (e.g. due to significant blood loss), or if alveolar pressure is unusually high (e.g. during positive pressure ventilation). Because these regions are now ventilated but not perfused, no gas exchange can take place (rendering affected alveoli alveolar dead space).

Inappropriate use of positive pressure ventilation with pressures in excess of 30 mmHg can impair venous return, potentially reducing cardiac output to life-threatening levels and causing death within minutes.
