= Elastic recoil =

Elastic recoil refers to the tendency of elastic structures to both resist deformation and return to a neutral state after being deformed. This is accomplished through the use of potential energy generated in an elastic structure as it is stretched by an external force. In biology, elastic recoil is demonstrated to varying degrees by different tissues, with more elastic tissues demonstrating a greater capacity to generate force in response to being stretched. In particular, elastic recoil serves an important biological function in the lungs, in blood vessels, in skeletal muscles, and in skin.

In the lungs, elastic recoil refers to the rebound after the stretching caused by inhalation. With inhalation, the intrapleural pressure of the lungs decreases. Relaxing the diaphragm during expiration allows the lungs to recoil, thereby returning the intrapleural pressure to its resting level. This phenomenon occurs because of the elastin in the elastic fibers in the connective tissue of the lungs, and because of the surface tension of the film of fluid that lines the alveoli. Elastic recoil is inversely related to lung compliance.

In blood vessels, elastic fibers expand from the force of the blood pumped from the left ventricle and recoil after the surge of blood passes. Elastic recoil allows blood vessels to maintain the pressure gradient which drives blood through the arterial system. Elastic recoil can also refer to the reduction in diameter of a cardiac stent after it is fully deployed. The viscoelastic behavior of the blood vessel resists the outward expansion of the stent, which forms a new equilibrium condition between the stent and the vessel. Stents which demonstrate a large amount of elastic recoil may lack the ability to adequately support the blood vessel and maintain patency. Design and material composition of stents directly relate to how well they are able to resist elastic recoil.

Elastic recoil in skeletal muscles drives some of the fastest and most powerful biological movements. For example, by leveraging spring force capacity and elastic structure stiffness, frogs are able to increase their jumping power.

In skin, elastic recoil refers to the ability to "snap" back to its original position when stretched. The optimal elasticity of skin allows it to stretch without becoming deformed.

== See also ==
- Lung compliance
- Elasticity (physics)
- Recoil (rheology)
