= Starling resistor =

Variable resistance mechanism used for flow control in heart surgery

The Starling resistor

The Starling resistor was invented by English physiologist Ernest Starling and used in an isolated-heart preparation during work which would later lead to the "Frank–Starling law of the heart".

The device consisted of an elastic fluid-filled collapsible-tube mounted inside a chamber filled with air. The static pressure inside the chamber was used to control the degree of collapse of the tube, so providing a variable resistor. This resistance was used to simulate TPR, or total peripheral (vascular) resistance.

Starling resistors have been used both as an instrument in the study of interesting physiological phenomena (e.g. pharyngeal collapse during obstructed breathing or OSA) and as a rich source of physical phenomena in their own right. Two non-linear behaviours are characteristic: 1) the “waterfall effect” wherein, subsequent to collapse, the flow through the tube becomes independent of the downstream pressure and 2) self-excited oscillations. Expiratory flow-limitation in the disease COPD is an example of the former behaviour and snoring an example of the latter.
