= Intrapleural pressure =

Refers to the pressure within the pleural cavity

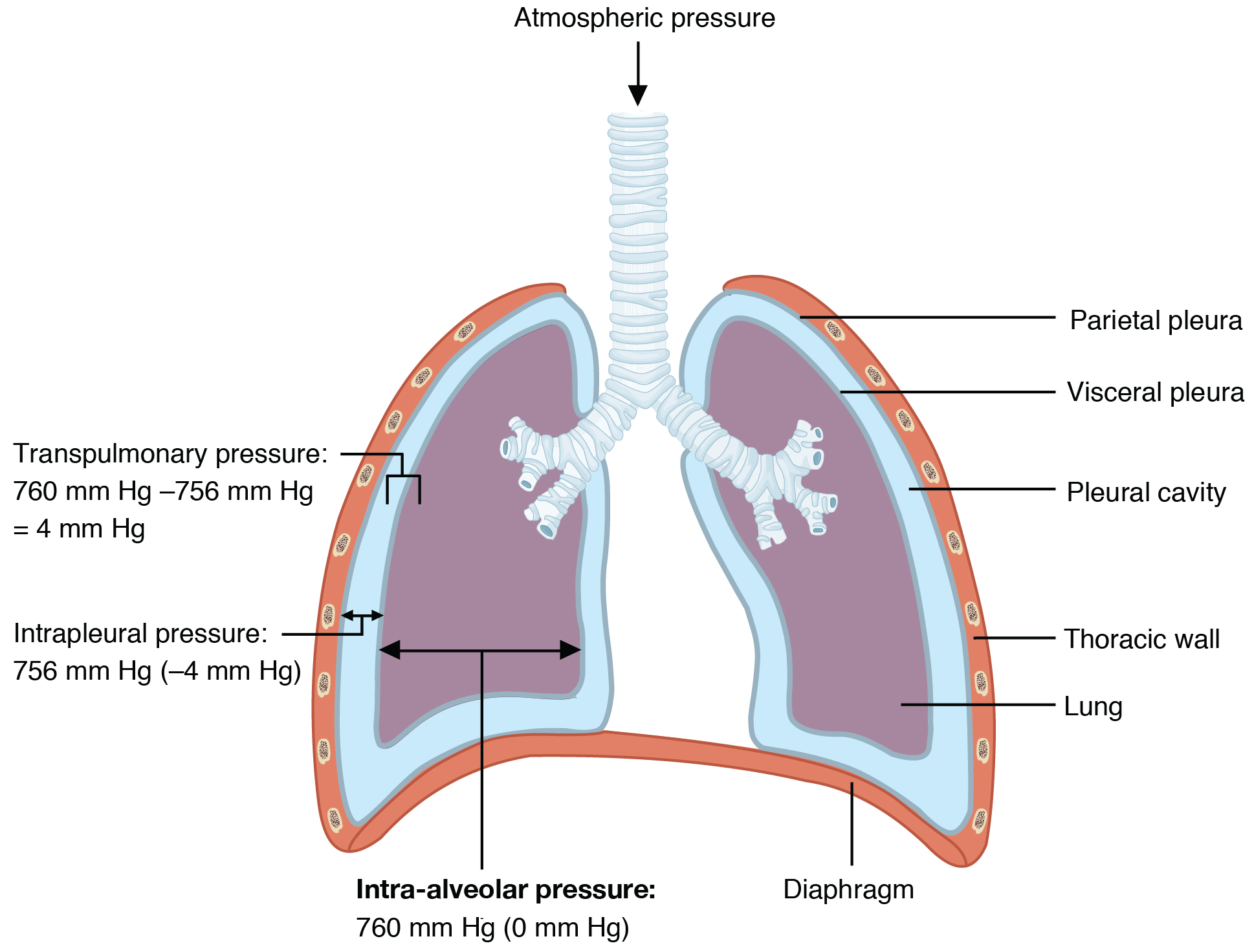
Image illustrating transpulmonary, intrapleural and intra-alveolar pressure

In physiology, intrapleural pressure is the pressure within the pleural cavity. Normally, it is slightly less than the atmospheric pressure, about −4 mm Hg while neither inspiring or expiring; during normal breathing, it normally cyclically changes ±2 mm Hg, decreasing with inspiration and increasing with expiration. During strenuous breathing however, it may change by as much as ±50 mm Hg. ITP depends on the ventilation phase, atmospheric pressure, and the volume of the intrapleural cavity.

ITP is normally always slightly negative to prevent lungs from collapsing, and is maintained by the tendency of the lungs and chest to recoil away from each other. When air is sucked into the pleural cavity, the negative ITP is lost, a condition known as pneumothorax.

== Physiology ==
=== Determinants ===
Physiological:

1. Müller's maneuver (forced inspiration against a closed glottis results in negative pressure) can temporarily but significantly decrease the intrapleural pressure.
2. Deep inspiration

Pathological:

1. Emphysema
2. Pneumothorax Condition

=== Cardiovascular effects ===
Cardiac filling depends upon the pressure outside the heart. The cyclical changes in ITP during inspiration and expiration promote or hamper cardiac filling, respectively.
