= Bailout bottle =

Emergency gas supply cylinder carried by a diver

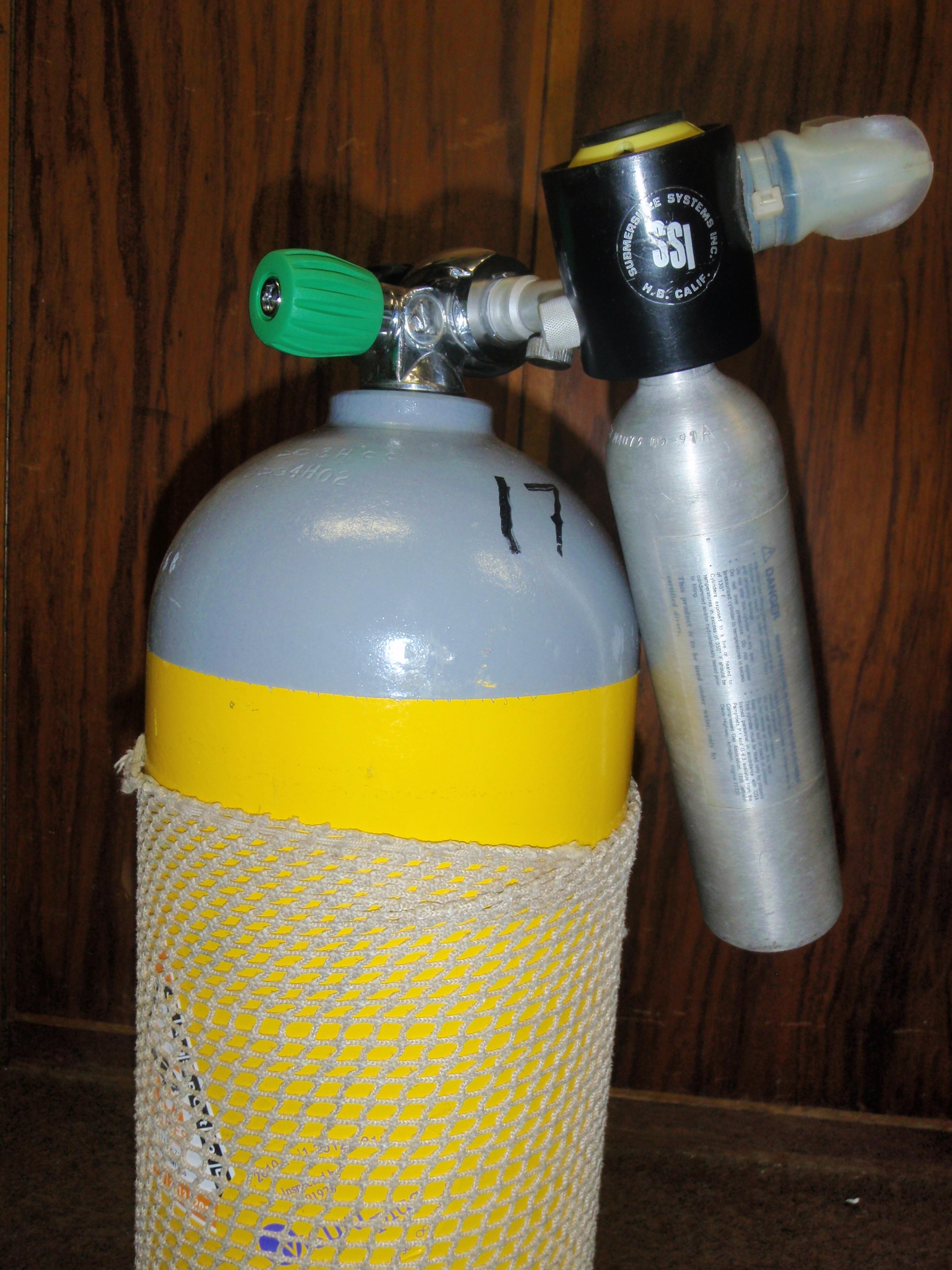
- Filling a spare air bailout cylinder
- Other names: Bailout cylinder, emergency gas supply
- Uses: Emergency supply of breathing gas
- Related items: Pony bottle

A bailout bottle (BoB) or, more formally, bailout cylinder is a scuba cylinder carried by an underwater diver for use as an emergency supply of breathing gas in the event of a primary gas supply failure. A bailout cylinder may be carried by a scuba diver in addition to the primary scuba set, or by a surface supplied diver using either free-flow or demand systems. The bailout gas is not intended for use during the dive except in an emergency. The term may refer to just the cylinder, or the bailout set or emergency gas supply (EGS), which is the cylinder with the gas delivery system attached. The bailout set or bailout system is the combination of the emergency gas cylinder with the gas delivery system to the diver, which includes a diving regulator with either a demand valve, a bailout block, or a bailout valve (BOV).

In solo diving, a buddy bottle is a bailout cylinder carried as a substitute for an emergency gas supply from a diving buddy. A bailout cylinder for recreational scuba diving is often a small cylinder, known as a pony bottle, with a normal scuba regulator set, or a smaller cylinder with a combined first and second stage integrated with the cylinder valve, known as "Spare air", after a well known example of the type.

Rebreathers also have bailout systems, often including an open-circuit bailout bottle.

== Purpose ==
The purpose of the bailout cylinder is to provide a fully redundant breathing gas supply for use in emergencies where a single gas mixture is appropriate. If more than one mixture is necessary for the ascent, redundant breathing gas is typically split between two or more cylinders carried by the diver, and in penetration diving where the diver is constrained to use the same route for exit as for entry, cylinders may be staged, which is a term meaning stowed along the route of the guideline, to be retrieved on the return. The procedure of switching to an emergency gas supply is called bailout, and may be from any gas supply planned for use at that stage of the dive to any gas supply available that is acceptable for use at the current depth in an emergency. Bailout may be temporary, to allow the diver to deal with a problem that can be fixed, such as a closed cylinder valve, or may continue until the end of the dive, for an intractable problem such as an out-of-gas incident. Bailout to open circuit is commonly recommended while dealing with rebreather faults where the composition of the loop gas is uncertain.

== Bailout cylinders for use with scuba ==
For scuba, a "bailout bottle" or "self-contained ascent bottle" is a small diving cylinder meant to be used as an alternate air source to allow a controlled ascent with any required decompression, in place of a controlled emergency swimming ascent, which will not allow required decompression. A bailout cylinder is required equipment for a professional diver using scuba in some circumstances.

=== Types ===
A pony bottle is an example of a small bailout cylinder which has a standard diving regulator with first and second stages. There are also significantly smaller cylinders which have the first stage — and in the smallest models also the second stage — integrated into the cylinder valve itself. A well-known example of this class of bailout bottle is the "Spare Air" set, which can supply a few breaths to allow the diver to ascend at a safe rate, but not enough to do a decompression stop. This type of bailout bottle is typically carried in a holster that is attached to the diver's harness.

"Spare Air" bailout bottles, introduced in the 1980s, are very small cylinders with integral scuba regulators. Their disadvantage is that in many emergency situations they do not have sufficient capacity to get a diver back to the surface safely, and thus may cause divers carrying them to feel an unjustified sense of safety. Their advantage is that they are compact and easy to deploy, and that a small amount of air is better than none in an emergency.

=== Capacity ===
A review carried out by Scuba Diving magazine attempted to give a sense of from what depth bailout bottles of various capacities could get divers to the surface under maximum safe ascent rates, though the review cautioned that the reviewers were in controlled conditions and thus could not replicate the circumstances of an actual panicked diver. The review found that a 1.7-cubic-foot (0.24 L) bottle had sufficient air to get the reviewing diver from 45 feet (14 m) to the surface; a 3-cubic-foot (0.4 L) bottle from a depth of 70 feet (21 m); and a 6-cubic-foot (0.8 L) bottle from the maximum reviewed depth of 132 feet (40 m), which is the maximum depth recommended for recreational dives by some training agencies. A bell diver must be able to return to the bell on the contents of the bailout cylinder, which will be influenced by the depth and umbilical length, and limited by the size of the bell entry lock manway.

=== Mounting arrangements ===
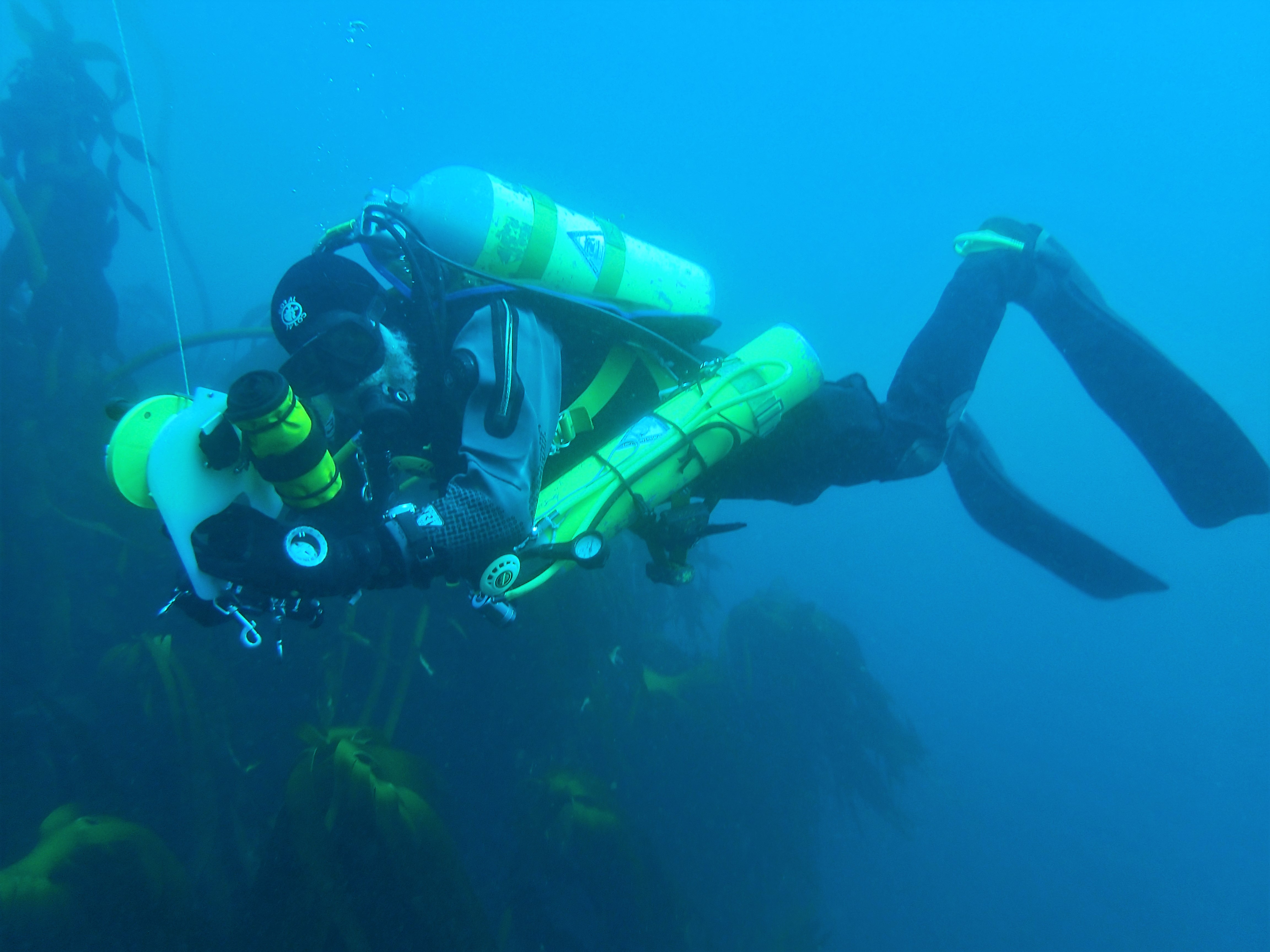
Solo scuba diver with sling mounted 5.5 litre (40 cu ft) aluminium bailout cylinder

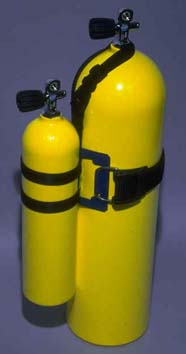
A pony bottle strapped to the back cylinder

A bailout cylinder is defined by its function, and may be carried in any convenient way. The small "Spare Air" type is commonly carried in a pocket type holster which is strapped to the harness where it can easily be reached, usually somewhere on the front of a jacket style buoyancy compensator. Larger bailout cylinders may be strapped to the back cylinder, (see Pony bottle), or suspended from the harness D-rings along the side of the diver as a side-mount, or sling cylinder. Surface-supplied divers usually carry the bailout set on a back-mount harness, as this leaves the arms unencumbered for work.

== Bailout systems used with rebreathers ==
In rebreather diving, bailout to open circuit is a procedure where the diver switches from breathing from the rebreather loop to open circuit. This is done when the loop is compromised for any reason, and is often done temporarily when there is some doubt that the gas in the loop is right for the depth. Bailout to open circuit may be a local switch-over at the bailout valve (BOV) to breathe gas directly from the diluent cylinder, or may be a switch to off-board gas, which is carried in an independent cylinder and is directly equivalent to open circuit bailout. This may be done through an off-board supply connected to the BOV or through a regular fully independent bailout set carried for the purpose. Both options may be available on deep dives with long decompression obligations. Occasionally rebreather divers will carry a bailout rebreather, when it is not practical to carry the required gas volume for open circuit bailout.

== Bailout cylinders for use with surface-supplied equipment ==
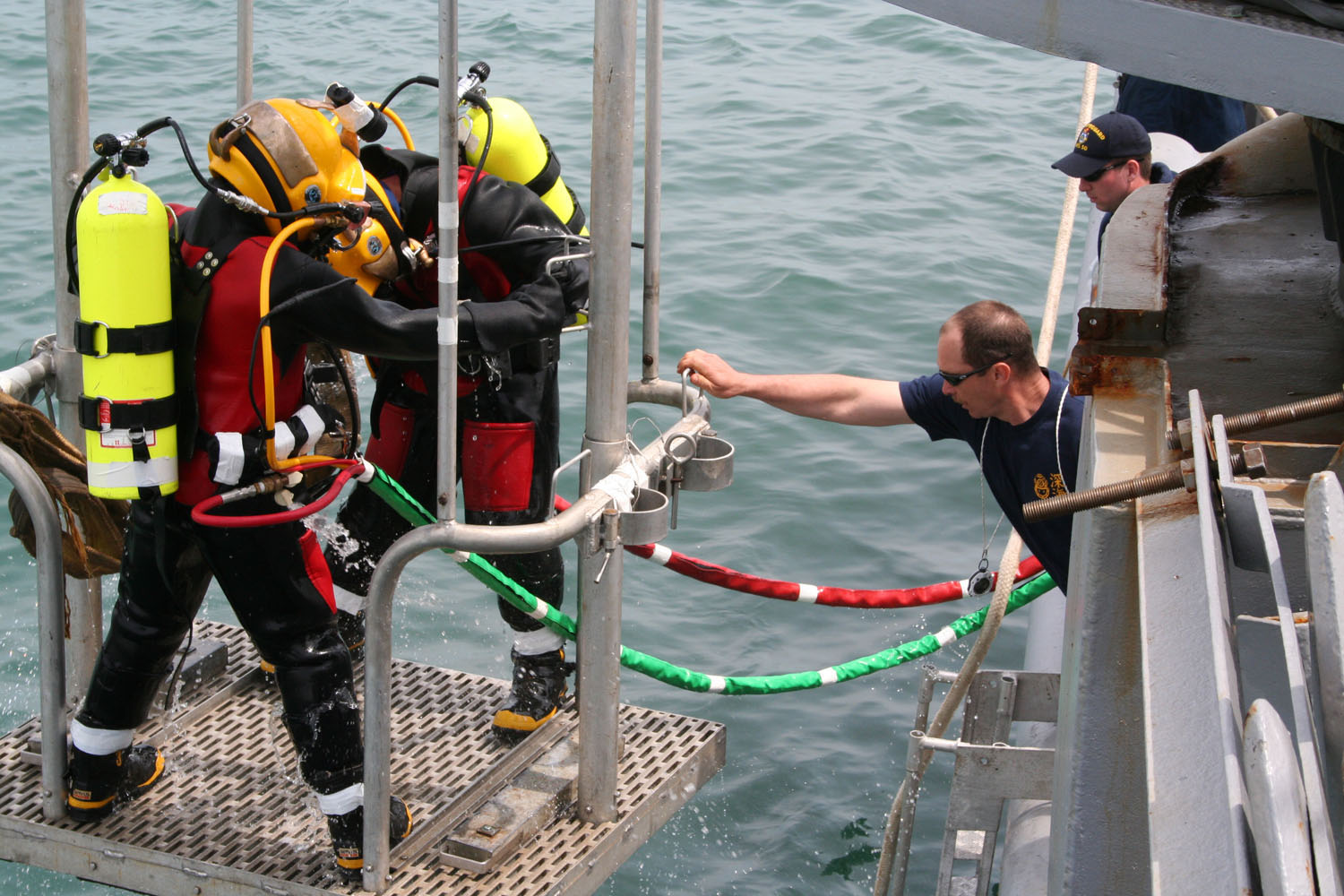
Surface-supplied divers riding a diving stage. Each carries a scuba bailout cylinder on his back.

For commercial diving using surface-supplied breathing gas, the bailout cylinder is in many cases required by health and safety legislation and approved codes of practice as an obligatory component of the diving system. In this application the intention is that the bailout cylinder should hold sufficient breathing gas for the diver to be able to reach a place of safety where more breathing gas is available, such as the surface or a diving bell. To achieve this the cylinder must contain enough gas to allow decompression if that is included in the planned dive profile and there is no bell. Cylinder volumes are generally at least 7 litres, and may in some cases be as much as twin 12-litre sets. Bailout sets used by closed bell divers must provide enough gas to return to the bell, and must fit through the bottom airlock door.

== Bailout gas ==
The emergency gas supply must support life at any depth where it is likely to be used. It will almost always be used for ascent or return to the bell, so a relatively oxygen-rich mixture will usually be advantageous. In closed bell diving an unusually high oxygen partial pressure of 2.8 bar as used in therapeutic decompression was recommended by Association of Offshore Diving Contractors (AODC) and endorsed by the Diving Medical Advisory Council (DMAC) in 1981, on the assumption that if the diver does not make it back into the bell on the bailout gas, or loses consciousness to acute oxygen toxicity, the chances of successful resuscitation will be better than in the case of hypoxia. This strategy only holds when bailout is at constant pressure, the diver's airway is secured by a helmet, and there is a bellman to assist, as the risk of losing consciousness is relatively high.

Scuba divers cannot accept a high risk of oxygen toxicity convulsions and would usually consider an oxygen partial pressure of 1.6 bar to be the upper limit, though exposure at this pressure is likely to be of very short duration if an immediate ascent is started. It is common practice to use a non-optimised gas, as emergencies are not expected, and the same cylinder with the same gas may be carried on several dives, as long as the remaining quantity is sufficient. It must mainly be acceptably safe to breathe at the depths where it may be used.

The Diving Medical Advisory Council has more recently (2016) made a more conservative recommendation of an oxygen partial pressure for open circuit bailout for saturation divers of between 1.4 and 0.4 bar.

== Alternatives ==
Alternatives to a bailout cylinder include:

- A bailout rebreather, which must be ready for use at all times, and the diver must be competent to make the switch and secure the malfunctioning equipment to retain neutral buoyancy.
- Team gas redundancy, as in buddy diving, where each diver in the team relies on the other divers to share gas in an emergency. This requires strict discipline and situational awareness from all members of the team to ensure that they are immediately available and competent to share gas if one of them has an out-of-gas emergency. In penetration diving using the rule of thirds and stage cylinders, team gas redundancy is applied.
- Emergency ascent is practicable and may be acceptable as the planned contingency procedure when the total time to surface is short enough that the diver can do it on their last breath before the gas supply was cut off. This implies that no decompression stops are needed, and the distance to the free surface is short enough and clear of obstacles, and that the diver will not be required to exert themself much during the ascent to counteract negative buoyancy. For a fit and skilled diver this could be as deep as 30 m, but it is a decision a recreational diver must be competent to make for themself. A professional diver would not usually be allowed to dive to this depth without some form of emergency gas supply, as the risk is relatively high and there are reasonably practicable measures available to significantly reduce the risk.

== See also ==
- Alternative air source – Emergency supply of breathing gas for an underwater diver
- Buddy breathing – Technique for sharing breathing gas from a single mouthpiece
- Diving equipment – Equipment used to facilitate underwater diving
- Surface-supplied diving – Underwater diving breathing gas supplied from the surface
