= Free ascent =

Free ascent may refer to:

- Emergency ascent from a scuba dive where there is no breathing gas available
- Ascent of a route in free climbing, as opposed to aid climbing
