= Pony bottle =

Small independent scuba cylinder usually carried for emergency gas supply

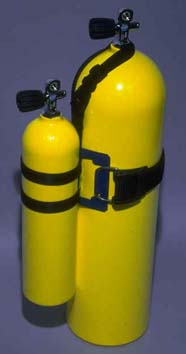
- A pony bottle (left) attached to a larger cylinder
- Uses: Scuba diving cylinder for supply of emergency breathing gas or for short, shallow dives
- Related items: Bailout bottle

A pony bottle or pony cylinder is a small diving cylinder which is fitted with an independent regulator, and is usually carried by a scuba diver as an auxiliary scuba set, though it may also be used as the primary cylinder for short and shallow dives. In an emergency, such as depletion of the diver's main air supply, it can be used as an alternative air source or bailout bottle to allow a normal ascent in place of a controlled emergency swimming ascent. The key attribute of a pony bottle is that it is a totally independent source of breathing gas for the diver in a small cylinder.

Pony bottles are often used by divers who understand that no matter their preparation and planning, accidents may happen, and cannot, or do not choose to depend on another diver for emergency breathing gas. They are carried by the diver in one of several alternative configurations, and the capacity and contents should be sufficient to allow a safe ascent from any point in the planned dive profile. The name pony is due to the smaller size, often of only a few litres capacity. The term is generally used by recreational divers. Professional divers would normally refer to a cylinder in this service as a bailout cylinder or emergency gas supply.

== Configuration ==
In a pony bottle emergency gas system the back-up regulator is a complete diving regulator (first and second stages, and often a submersible pressure gauge) on a separate cylinder which is not intended for use as primary breathing gas during the dive. It provides a totally redundant emergency air supply. The pony bottle is usually smaller than the primary cylinder, but it should provide enough breathing gas to make a totally controlled return to the surface, including any required decompression stop or safety stop along the way. The pony cylinder capacity will depend on the profile for safe ascent to the surface required for a particular dive plan. Popular sizes for use as a bailout cylinder include 6, 13 or 19 cu ft in the US, while 2 litre and 3 litre are common sizes in Europe. For deep or deep technical diving or wreck diving 30 and 40 cu ft (5 litre and 7 litre) cylinders are often used. The bailout pony bottle is a basic requirement for low risk solo diving if the dive is too deep for a safe free ascent, as there is no source of emergency air from a buddy. In scientific diving operations, pony bottles can be standard equipment in tethered scuba diving operations where the diver is often solo but connected to the surface by communications equipment, and an emergency gas supply is mandated. Several scuba manufacturers produce a minimalist backpack harness that supports a back mounted pony cylinder exclusively for use in shallow water diving or for boat maintenance purposes.

== Options for carrying ==
There are several options for the mounting of a pony bottle. The most common way a pony bottle is carried is by fixing it to the side of the primary (back gas) scuba cylinder by straps or clamps, which may include a quick-release system. The most common alternative is "slinging" it between two D-rings on the diver's scuba harness or buoyancy compensator. Another possibility for smaller sets is to mount the bottle in a small carrying bag, from which it may be easily removed. This affords the opportunity of "handing off" the entire system to a buddy diver if that buddy needs to share air. This is may be a safer procedure than the buddies being connected through use of hosed regulators. The addition of a pony bottle to the diver's equipment will usually add an off-centre weight to the side on which it is mounted. To compensate for this a balancing weight may be added to the tank band on the opposite side of the pony, or in an off-side weight pocket. Attention must also be paid to where the pony bottle second stage regulator is placed during the pre-dive buddy check.

== Alternative solutions ==
The pony bottle is usually used a source of redundant emergency breathing gas for the diver as a backup in the event of failure of the primary system. The pony bottle is intended for use in "bail out" situations in which the dive must be aborted and safe return to the surface must be facilitated. There are several alternative ways to providing such a redundant gas supply for bail out purposes which are in common use in diving. These alternatives are listed in the following table along with a comment on how these solutions compare with pony bottle usage as a backup system:

| Alternative air source | Comparative functionality |
|---|---|
| Secondary demand valve (Octopus) | The octopus is an additional second stage regulator taken off the primary first stage regulator and primary air supply. A failure of the first stage regulator or the exhaustion of the gas supply from the primary cylinder is a failure of the entire gas supply. |
| Dual outlet cylinder valves | The primary cylinder can be fitted with a valve with two independently valved outlets, each of which can mount an independent first stage regulator. One outlet is connected to the primary regulator, the other to the secondary (backup) regulator used in place of an octopus second stage. This eliminates the danger of failure in a single first-stage system. It does not mitigate the risk of loss of breathing gas from the single primary gas supply, but allows a free-flow to be managed by shutting the valve to the malfunctioning regulator. |
| Manifolded twins (doubles) | Using a twin tank system with isolating manifold provides full redundancy in gas supply as well as the ability to isolate most faulty components which might be leaking away breathing gas. Doubles also provide much greater capacity than pony bottles. However, because the gas in the system is also for use during the dive itself it requires that the diver pays sufficient attention to gas management to ensure that an adequate amount of reserve is available for any bailout requirement at any phase of the dive. If the second tank only serves the purpose of bailout, the diver is burdened with considerable extra bulk and weight which is not required in a smaller pony bottle system. |
| Sidemount | Sidemount systems use two cylinders complete with regulators positioned alongside the diver on opposite sides, and has a similar functionality to independent doubles, as no isolating manifold is used. This can reduce the gas available in some modes of regulator failure, though manual control of the cylinder valve can be used to manage a free flow. Sidemount is a preferred option for some cave and wreck divers as it can pass through smaller restrictions than back mounted doubles by temporarily moving the tanks in front of the diver. |

== Choice of size ==
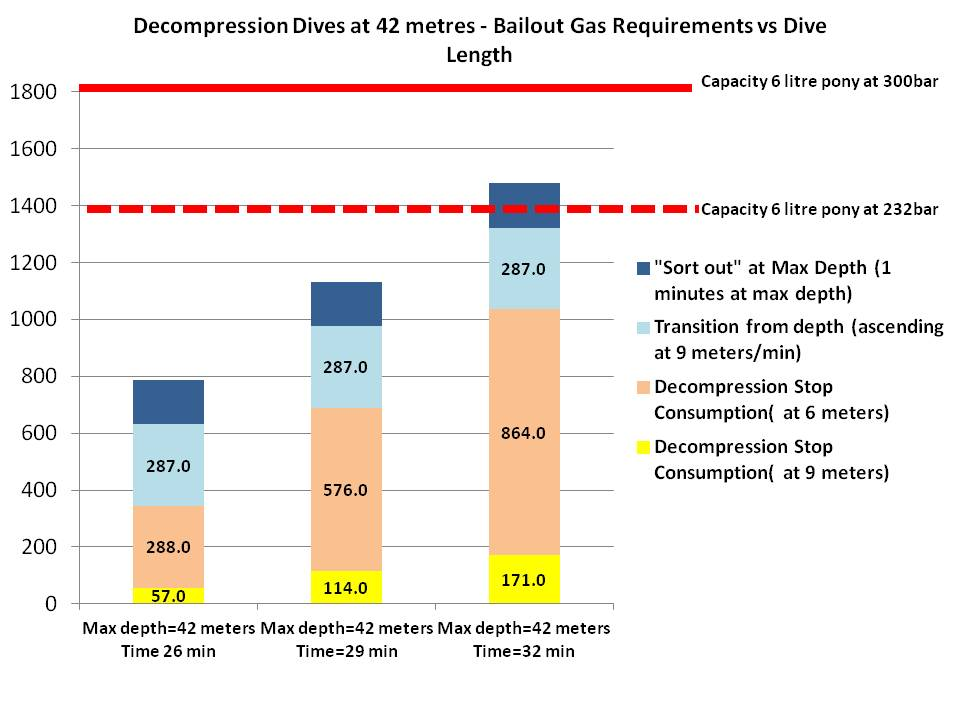
Bailout gas requirements using a Pony Bottle in Decompression Dives The graph shows the amount of breathing gas required (in litres) for a series of 42 metre decompression dives to achieve the decompression requirements of the British Sub-Aqua Club (1988) diving tables for required stops at 6 and 9 metres. In this example all breathing is assumed at the elevated level of 30 litres/min. Under these particular conditions a 6-litre 300bar steel pony has the capacity to provide adequate bailout but not the 6 litre 232 bar.

Given the function of the pony bottle to provide a source of breathing gas for a controlled and prudent ascent to the surface in an emergency, the size is chosen to be sufficient for that purpose. Even when doing no decompression diving, the total reserves of breathing gas should be sufficient to supply three phases of the ascent:

1. gas to allow for a short period at depth to quickly sort out any problems, if necessary, before starting ascent
2. enough gas to make a safe gradual ascent to safety or obligatory decompression stop depth and
3. enough gas to do an all required decompression.

At the end of this time there should still be sufficient pressure for smooth flow from the regulator.

Pony bottle gas consumption versus various dive depths calculated at a rate of 30 litres per minute (RMV)
| Stage of ascent | Max depth 15 metres (49 ft) | Max depth 20 metres (66 ft) | Max depth 30 metres (98 ft) | Max depth 40 metres (130 ft) |
|---|---|---|---|---|
| Sort out problem: 2 minutes at max depth | 150 litres (5.3 cu ft) | 180 litres (6.4 cu ft) | 240 litres (8.5 cu ft) | 300 litres (11 cu ft) |
| Ascent from max depth to 5 metres (16 ft): ascending at 9 metres per minute (30 ft/min) | 67 litres (2.4 cu ft) | 113 litres (4.0 cu ft) | 229 litres (8.1 cu ft) | 379 litres (13.4 cu ft) |
| Safety stop: 3 minutes at 5 metres (16 ft) | 135 litres (4.8 cu ft) | 135 litres (4.8 cu ft) | 135 litres (4.8 cu ft) | 135 litres (4.8 cu ft) |
| Total | 352 litres (12.4 cu ft) | 428 litres (15.1 cu ft) | 604 litres (21.3 cu ft) | 814 litres (28.7 cu ft) |
| Air available at 150 bars (2,200 psi) | | | | |
| Pony bottle 3 litre | 450 litres (16 cu ft) | 450 litres (16 cu ft) | 450 litres (16 cu ft) | 450 litres (16 cu ft) |
| Pony bottle 6 litre | 900 litres (32 cu ft) | 900 litres (32 cu ft) | 900 litres (32 cu ft) | 900 litres (32 cu ft) |

The table above is constructed to show gas consumed in such a scenario: 2 minutes at depth for "sort-out"; a safe rate of ascent to 5 meters; followed by a 3-minute safety stop. Calculations are based on a heavy breathing rate of 30 L/min (1.06 cu ft/min) and an initial tank pressure of 150 bar (2,200 psi). In this particular scenario the 3 litre pony is just sufficient for diving at 20 meters but not 30 meters. A diver selecting a pony bottle would do a similar analysis for his/her own breathing rates, cylinder pressure to be used, and required ascent profile, or take advice in the selection. A submersible pressure gauge is required on the pony bottle regulator so that the pressure can be monitored during use to ensure that the diver surfaces before the gas runs out.

== Breathing gas ==
As shown in the example calculations, the capacity of standard pony bottles make them suitable for use as redundant bail-out devices for conventional recreational diving purposes – i.e. non decompression dives in open water. A general rule of gas usage in this range is that the "bailout gas should match existing breathing gas" so that the switch made between cylinders does not influence calculations for present or future decompression allowances. To maximize safety margins, pony bottles should be filled to their maximum allowable cylinder pressure to provide a maximum reserve for bailout purposes. Often in boats gas refills to these higher pressures are not available, so in these cases the pony can be filled prior to the dive trip excursion. Pony bottles are fitted with either A-clamp or DIN fitting valves so the appropriate fitting or adapter must be available should the pony need to be refilled.

== Safety considerations ==
Testing of pony bottle pressure and regulator function to insure that it is full and ready for use is part of the pre-dive checks. Some divers carry pony bottles mounted in a way that the cylinder valve is easily accessed, and dive with the regulator initially pressurised but with the cylinder valve closed to avoid possible loss of bailout gas due to a free flow. If the pony cylinder valve is in a position where it cannot be reached by the diver, there is a risk that the valve may be left closed with regulator and gauge pressurised and the gas will not be available in an emergency.

The regulators and the associated SPGs for the pony bottle and primary gas cylinder should be unmistakably different to avoid possible confusion in difficult circumstances (poor visibility or high stress) as mixing up these regulators or gauges can lead to a false "out of air" emergency. The pony bottle is not generally considered part of the normal gas supply for a dive or to extend a dive by using the pony bottle gas.

Limiting conditions vary with each diver and each profile, so it is necessary to analyze bailout requirements for each specific planned and contingency dive profile, cylinder volume and pressure, diving tables used and realistic assumed breathing rates.

== Pony bottles in technical diving ==
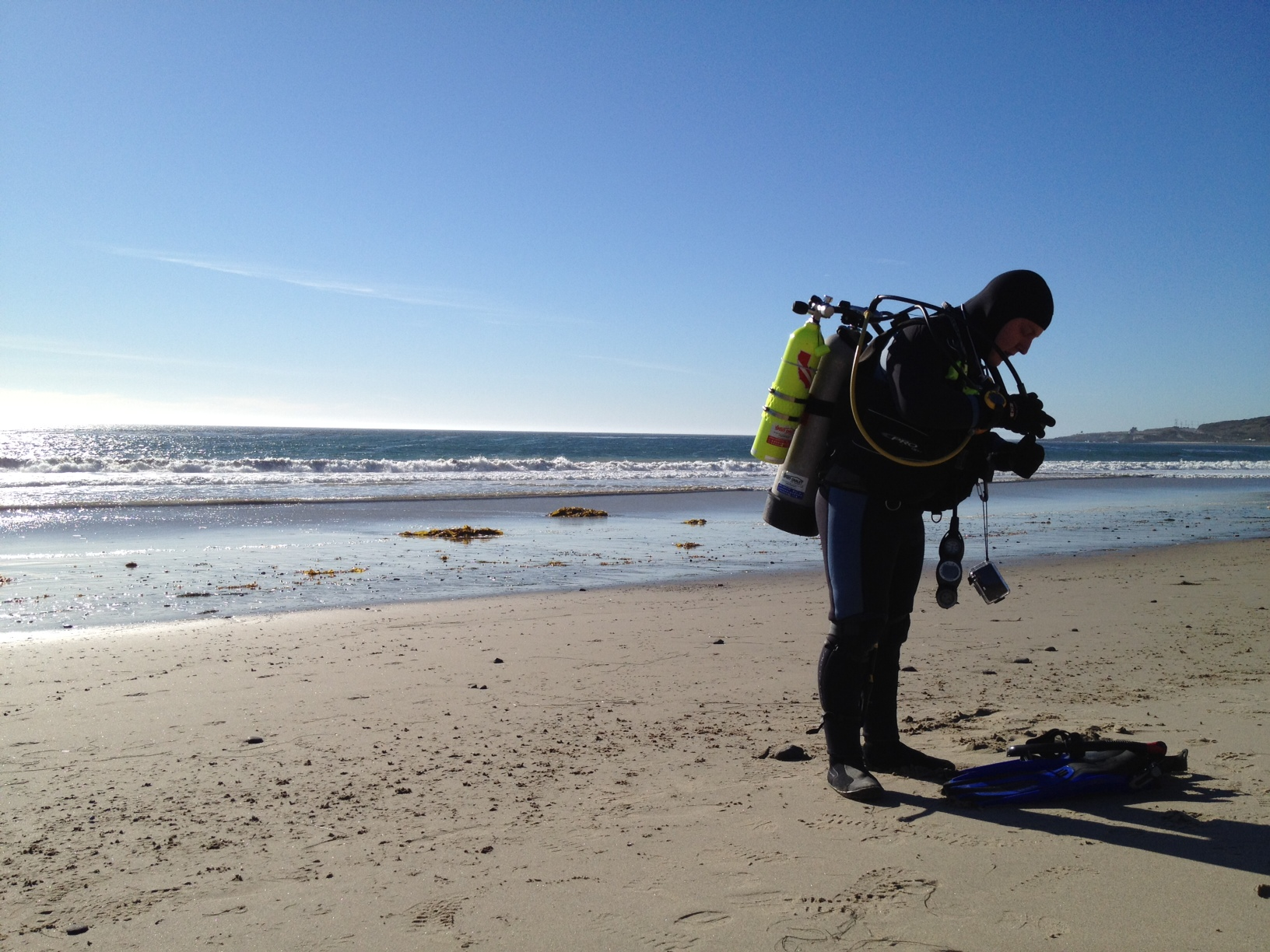
A 19 cu ft pony cylinder attached to an 80 cu ft back mounted main cylinder used for a redundant emergency breathing gas supply for solo diving

In technical diving, where larger volumes of breathing gas need to be supplied the usefulness of pony bottles greatly diminishes. This type of diving is the province of twinsets, rebreathers or even more complex assemblages. The diver however still needs to consider bailout – an interruption of the planned dive by breathing gas problems that requires a safe exit to the surface. In certain technical diving equipment configurations the use of larger pony bottles can again come to the fore, particular if the diving is not excessively deep and decompression requirements are modest. An example can be in the case of rebreathers, where the diluent gas supply is also used as a bailout bottle for rebreather failure. The capacity of the diluent bottle is very often insufficient for this bailout purpose, and an appropriate larger sized pony can serve as a "backup to the (onboard) bailout".

== See also ==
- Bailout cylinder – Emergency gas supply cylinder carried by a diver
- Bailout rebreather – Diving rebreather carried as an emergency gas supply
- Emergency gas supply – Alternative independent breathing gas supply carried by a diver
- Escape breathing apparatus – Self contained breathing apparatus providing gas to escape from a hazardous environment
