= Alternative air source =

Emergency supply of breathing gas for an underwater diver

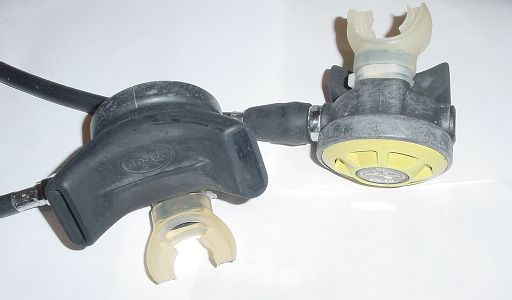
A pair of demand valves fitted to a scuba regulator

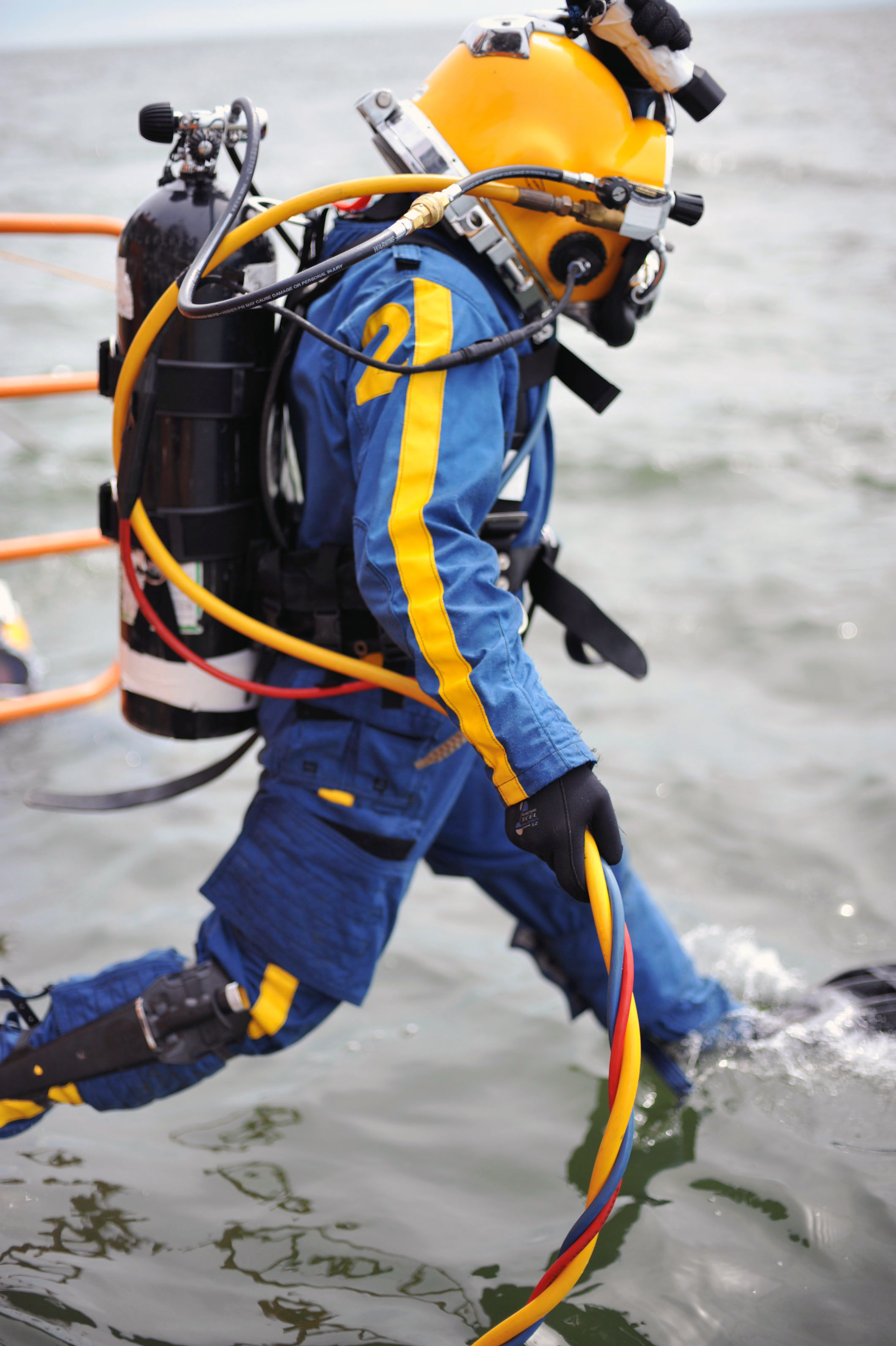
Navy surface supplied diver with back mount bailout cylinder

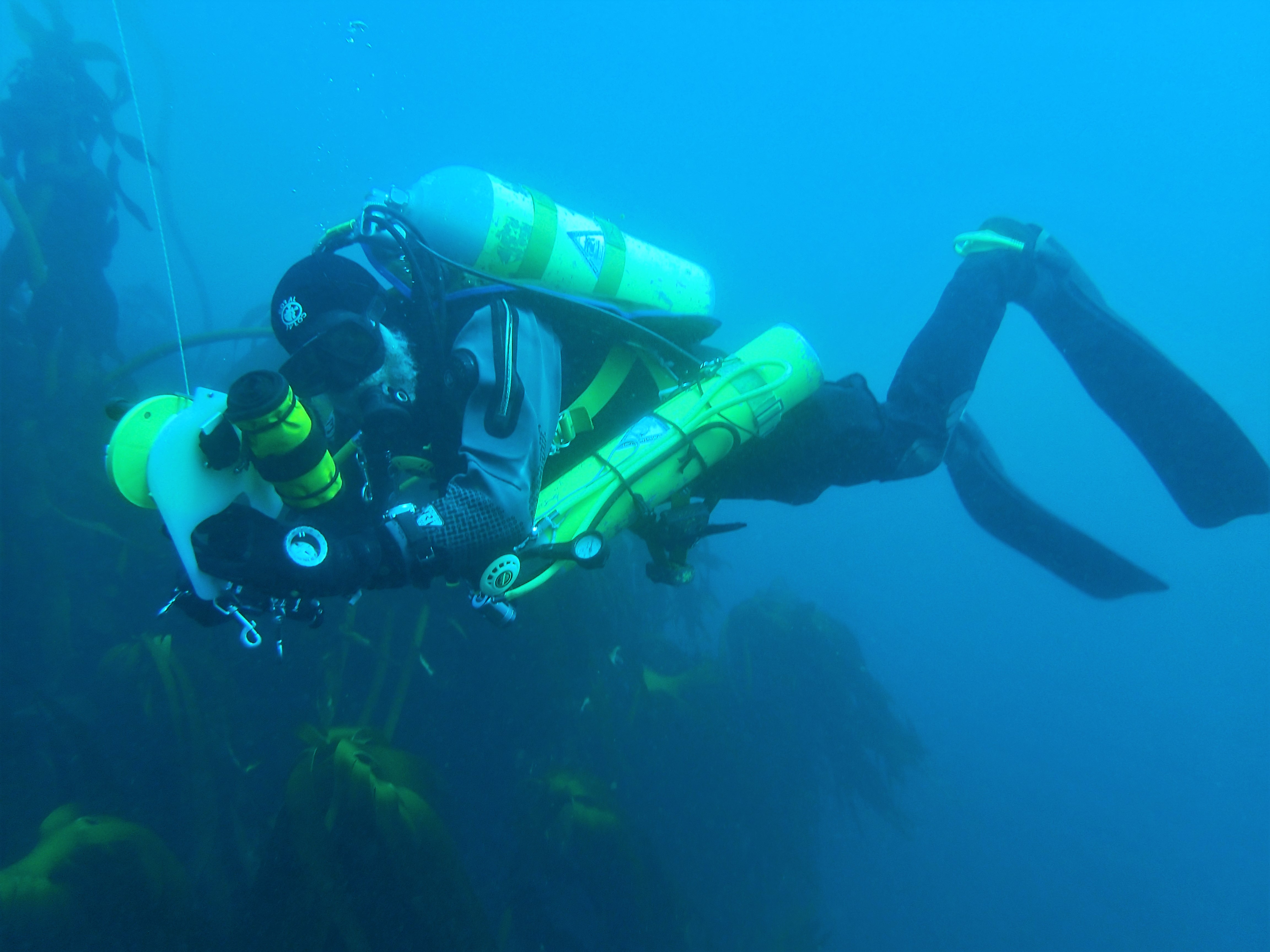
Solo scuba diver with sling mount bailout cylinder

In underwater diving, an alternative air source, or more generally alternative breathing gas source, is a secondary supply of air or other breathing gas for use by the diver in an emergency. Examples include an auxiliary demand valve, a pony bottle and bailout bottle.

An alternative air source may be fully redundant (completely independent of any part of the main air supply system) or non-redundant, if it can be compromised by any failure of the main air supply. From the diver's point of view, air supplied by a buddy or rescue diver is fully redundant, as it is unaffected by the diver's own air supply in any way, but a second regulator on a double cylinder valve or a secondary demand valve (octopus) is not redundant to the diver carrying it, as it is attached to his or her main air supply. Decompression gas can be considered an alternative gas supply only when the risk of breathing it at the current depth is acceptable.

Effective use of any alternate air source requires competence in the associated skill set. The procedures for receiving air from another diver or from one's own equipment are most effective and least likely to result in a life-threatening incident if well trained to the extent that they do not distract the diver from other essential matters. A major difference from buddy breathing is that the diver using a redundant alternative air source need not alternate breathing with the donor, which can be a substantial advantage in many circumstances. There is a further significant advantage when the alternate air source is carried by the diver using it, in that it is not necessary to locate the buddy before it is available, but this comes at the cost of extra equipment.

== Fully redundant alternative air sources ==
These are alternative sources of breathing gas which are independent of the main gas supply used by the diver. The main gas supply in the case of scuba is usually the back gas set (open circuit scuba cylinders or rebreather), and in surface supplied diving, the surface gas supplied via the diver's umbilical.

=== Bailout cylinder ===
The term bailout cylinder, bailout bottle or emergency gas supply (EGS) refers to a scuba cylinder carried by an underwater diver for use as an emergency supply of breathing gas in the event of a primary gas supply failure. A bailout cylinder may be carried by a scuba diver in addition to the primary scuba set, or by a surface supplied diver using either free-flow or demand systems. Scuba divers may also refer to their bailout bottle as a pony bottle. The bailout gas is not intended for use during the dive except in an emergency.

The term bailout bottle is generally applied by surface supplied divers to the scuba cylinder carried as an alternative breathing gas supply in case of a failure of the surface supplied breathing gas. The capacity of these back-mounted bailout cylinders must be sufficient to get the diver from the underwater worksite to a place of safety where more breathing gas is available, either the surface, or a diving bell or lockout submersible. and can be fairly small (7 litres) or quite large (twin 12 litre set), depending on the depth and duration of the dive.

==== Bailout cylinders for use with surface supplied equipment ====
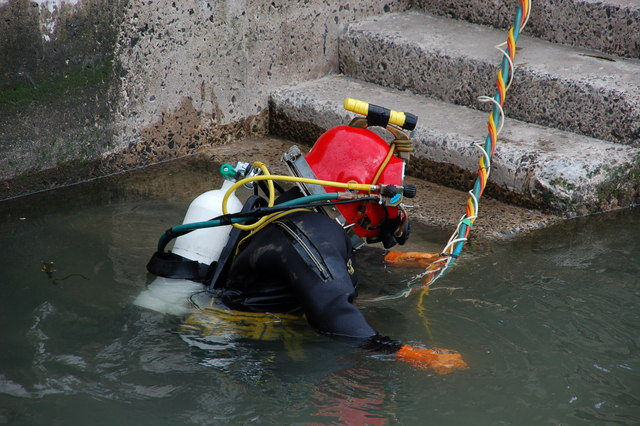
Surface supplied diver with bailout cylinder

For commercial diving using surface supplied breathing gas, the bailout cylinder is in many cases required by health and safety legislation and approved codes of practice as an obligatory component of the diving system. In this application the intention is that the bailout cylinder should hold sufficient breathing gas for the diver to be able to reach a place of safety where more breathing gas is available, such as the surface or a diving bell. To achieve this the cylinder must contain enough gas to allow decompression if that is included in the planned dive profile. Cylinder volumes are generally at least 7 litres, and may in some cases be as much as twin 12 litre sets.

==== Bailout cylinders for use with scuba ====
For scuba, a bailout bottle, self-contained ascent bottle or emergency gas supply is a small diving cylinder meant to be used as an alternate air source to allow a controlled ascent with any required decompression, in place of a controlled emergency swimming ascent, which will not allow required decompression. The use of a bailout bottle may be required by codes of practice or legislation in the case of professional divers.

A pony bottle is an example of a bailout cylinder which has a standard diving regulator with first and second stages. There are also significantly smaller cylinders which have the first stage — and in the smallest models also the second stage — integrated into the cylinder valve itself. A well-known example of this class of bailout bottle is the "Spare Air" set, which can supply a few breaths to allow the diver to ascend at a safe rate, but not enough to do a decompression stop. This type of bailout bottle is typically placed in a holster that is attached to the diver.

A review carried out by Scuba Diving magazine attempted to give a sense of from what depth bailout bottles of various capacities could get divers to the surface under maximum safe ascent rates, though the review cautioned that the reviewers were in controlled conditions and thus could not replicate the circumstances of an actual panicked diver. The review found that a 1.7-cubic-foot (0.24 L) bottle had sufficient air to get the reviewing diver from 45 feet (14 m) to the surface; a 3-cubic-foot (0.4 L) bottle from a depth of 70 feet (21 m); and a 6-cubic-foot (0.8 L) bottle from the maximum reviewed depth of 132 feet (40 m), which is the maximum depth recommended for recreational dives in some parts of the world.

===== Pony bottle =====
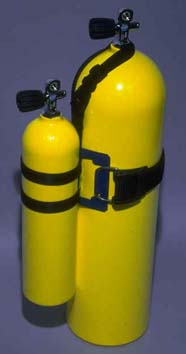
A pony bottle (left) attached to a larger cylinder

A pony bottle is a small independently filled diving cylinder, often of only a few litres capacity, which forms part of an extended scuba set and which is fitted with its own independent regulator. In an emergency, such as exhaustion of the diver's main air supply, it can be used as an alternate air source in place of a controlled emergency swimming ascent. The key attribute of a pony bottle is that it provides a totally independent and redundant source of breathing gas for the diver. A pony bottle is a specific configuration of bailout cylinder.

Configuration — In a pony bottle system the back-up regulator is a complete diving regulator (first and second stages, and usually a submersible pressure gauge) on a separate cylinder which is not intended for use as the primary breathing gas during the dive. It provides a totally redundant emergency air supply. The size of the pony bottle cylinder is usually smaller than that of the primary scuba cylinder. It should however provide enough breathing gas to make a totally controlled return to the surface, including any required decompression stop or safety stop planned for the ascent. The required pony cylinder capacity will depend on the profile for safe ascent to the surface required for a particular dive plan. A pony bottle used for sport diving may be 6, 13 or 19 cu ft in the US, while 2 litre and 3 litre are common sizes in Europe. For deep, technical diving or wreck diving, 30 and 40 cu ft (4 litre and 5.5 litre) cylinders are often used. The pony bottle is a minimum requirement for someone doing solo diving, as they have no alternative source of air in the form of a buddy's available tank and octopus regulator if the dive is to a depth where the diver is not able to do a safe free ascent. In scientific diving operations, pony bottles can be a standard part of tethered scuba diving operations where the diver is often solo but connected to the surface by communications equipment.

There are several options for the mounting of a pony bottle. The most common way a pony bottle is carried is by fixing it to the side of the primary (back gas) scuba cylinder by straps or clamps, which may include a quick-release system (as in the above picture). The most common alternative is "slinging" it between two D-rings on the diver's scuba harness or buoyancy compensator.

Choice of pony bottle size — The function of the pony bottle is to provide a source of breathing gas for a controlled and prudent ascent to the surface in an emergency situation, so the volume must be sufficient for that purpose. Even when doing no decompression diving, the total reserves of breathing gas must still be sufficient to supply three phases of the ascent:

1. enough gas to allow for a short period at depth to quickly sort out any problems, if necessary, before returning to the surface
2. enough gas to make a safe gradual ascent to safety stop depth and, preferably,
3. enough gas to do a complete safety stop.

At the end of this time the pony bottle should still hold enough gas to provide sufficient pressure for smooth flow from the regulator first stage.

Pony bottle gas consumption versus various dive depth	Litres consumed Max depth 15 m	Litres consumed Max depth 20 m	Litres consumed Max depth 30 m
Safety Stop (3 minute at 5 m)	135.0	135.0	135.0
Transition from depth (ascending at 9 m/min)	35.0	63.4	145.0
"Sort out" at Max Depth (2 minutes at max depth)	150.0	180.0	240.0
Total	320.0	378.4	520.0
Tank capacity at 150 bar (15 MPa) Pony bottle 3 litre (450 litre available) Pony bottle 6 litre (900 litre available)

The table above is constructed to show gas consumed in just such a scenario – 2 minutes at depth for bailout and preparation to ascend, a safe rate of ascent to 5 meters followed by a 3-minute safety stop. Calculations are based on a heavy breathing rate of 30 litres per minute and an initial tank pressure of 150 bar (2,200 psi). In this particular scenario the 3 litre pony is sufficient for diving at 20 meters but not 30 meters. These values may vary depending on the diver and other circumstances. A diver selecting a pony bottle can do such an analysis for his/her own breathing rates, cylinder pressure to be used, and required ascent profile, or take professional advice on the selection. Since monitoring of remaining air is a key safety issue during a dive, the submersible pressure gauge attached to the pony bottle regulator should be readable at any time during the dive.

===== Spare Air =====
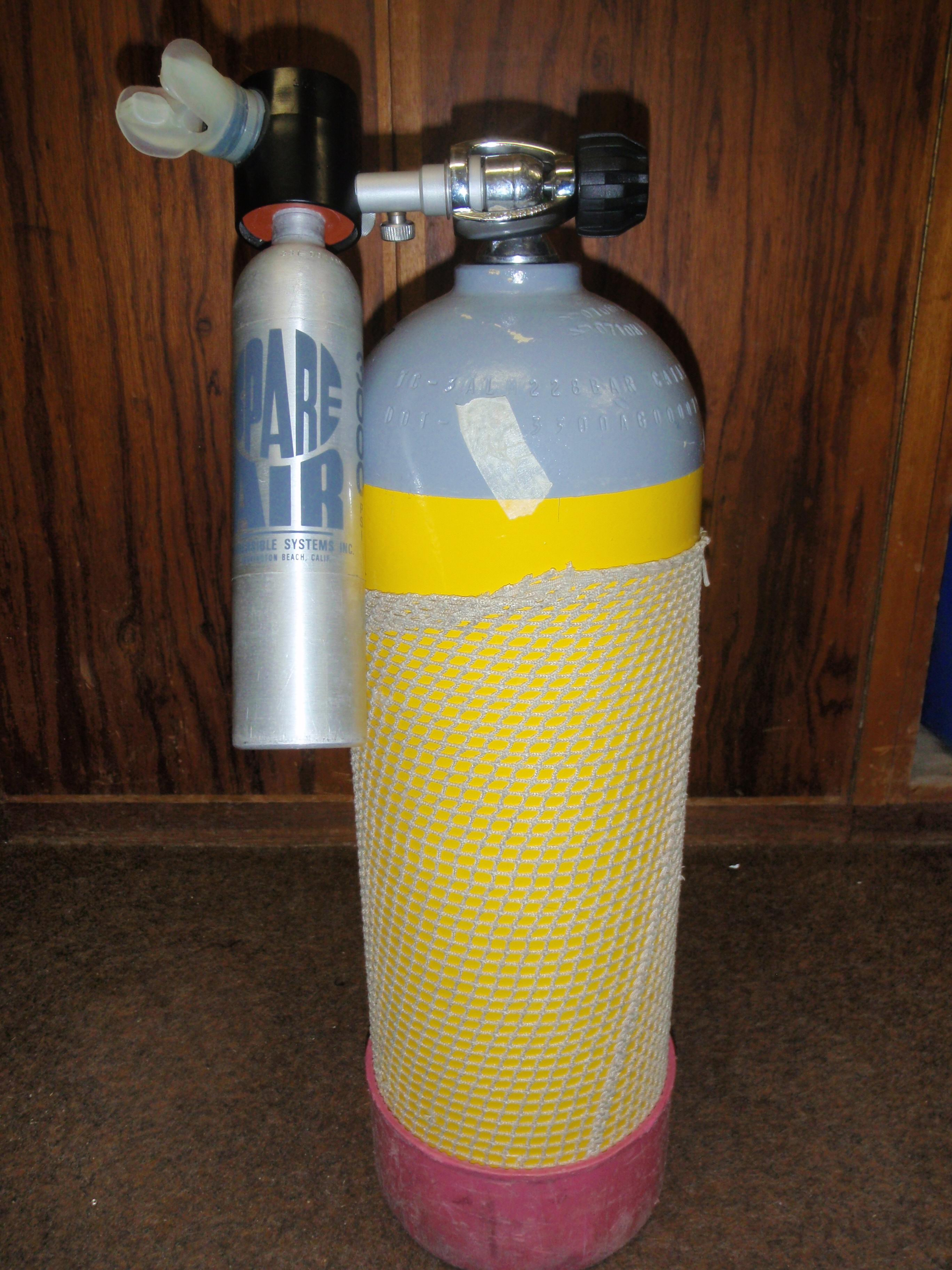
Charging a spare air cylinder from a larger primary scuba cylinder

The smaller cylinders which have a combined first and second stage regulator directly mounted into the cylinder neck thread are generally known as "Spare Air" after the commercially supplied unit of that name. These can provide a limited number of breaths for an out-of-air emergency and are suitable for relatively shallow dives without decompression. The smaller 1.7 cu ft Spare Air provides approximately 30 breaths, and the larger 3.0 cu ft approximately 60 breaths at surface pressure. The number of breaths provided in practice will depend on the diver's lung capacity, depth, exertion and state of mind. An ascent from 18 metres (60 ft) at a recommended rate of 9 metres per minute (30 ft/min) and a typical residual minute volume of 15 litres per minute for a fairly relaxed diver would use approximately 60 litres (2.1 cu ft) of free air (the equivalent volume of air at the surface). For some dive profiles this may be adequate. The manufacturers recommend these cylinders for use within recreational diving limits and suggest that very little training is required in their use.

The small size and weight of these units makes them relatively convenient and easy to carry, and more convenient for travel than larger cylinders. They can be handed off to another diver in need of air in an emergency more conveniently than larger cylinders. The spare air unit is commonly carried in a small pouch which can be attached to the diver's harness or buoyancy compensator. The unit itself may also be attached to the pouch by a safety leash so if accidentally dropped underwater it will not be lost.

Recharging is done through a connector which is supplied with the unit for this purpose, and which connects to the main cylinder valve to decant air for a top-up. This is usually done by the diver before the dive. A button gauge is provided to allow the diver to check the pressure.

Since their introduction in the 1980s, "Spare Air" cylinders have been the subject of debate within the diving community. The argument against them is that they do not have sufficient capacity to get a diver in many emergency situations back to the surface safely, and thus cause divers to feel a false sense of safety. The arguments in favour are that "Spare Air" cylinders are both less bulky and less complicated than pony bottles, as they are always on and have no hoses or pressure gauges, and that some air is better than none in an emergency.

=== Independent twins and side mount twins ===
Independent twin cylinders, (Two cylinders of about the same capacity mounted together on the back of the diver, each with its own regulator) are unquestionably a redundant gas supply configuration, as there is no possibility of flow from one to the other during the dive. Use of independent twins for bailout requires the diver to ensure that at all times during the dive both cylinders have sufficient gas remaining to ensure a safe ascent, including any decompression that may be required. This requirement is based on the possibility that either of the cylinders may become unusable without warning. This requirement means that the cylinders are usually breathed in turn, and changed before the pressure drops to the critical pressure for that stage of the dive. This system is economical on gas, and highly reliable when done correctly, but relatively heavy on task loading. Side-mounted cylinders are equivalent to independent back-mounted cylinders, and the cylinder valves are easily accessible, so may be closed during periods when the cylinder is not in use, to reduce the risk of gas loss by free-flow. Gas management is the same as for back-mounted independent twins.

=== Manifolded twins ===
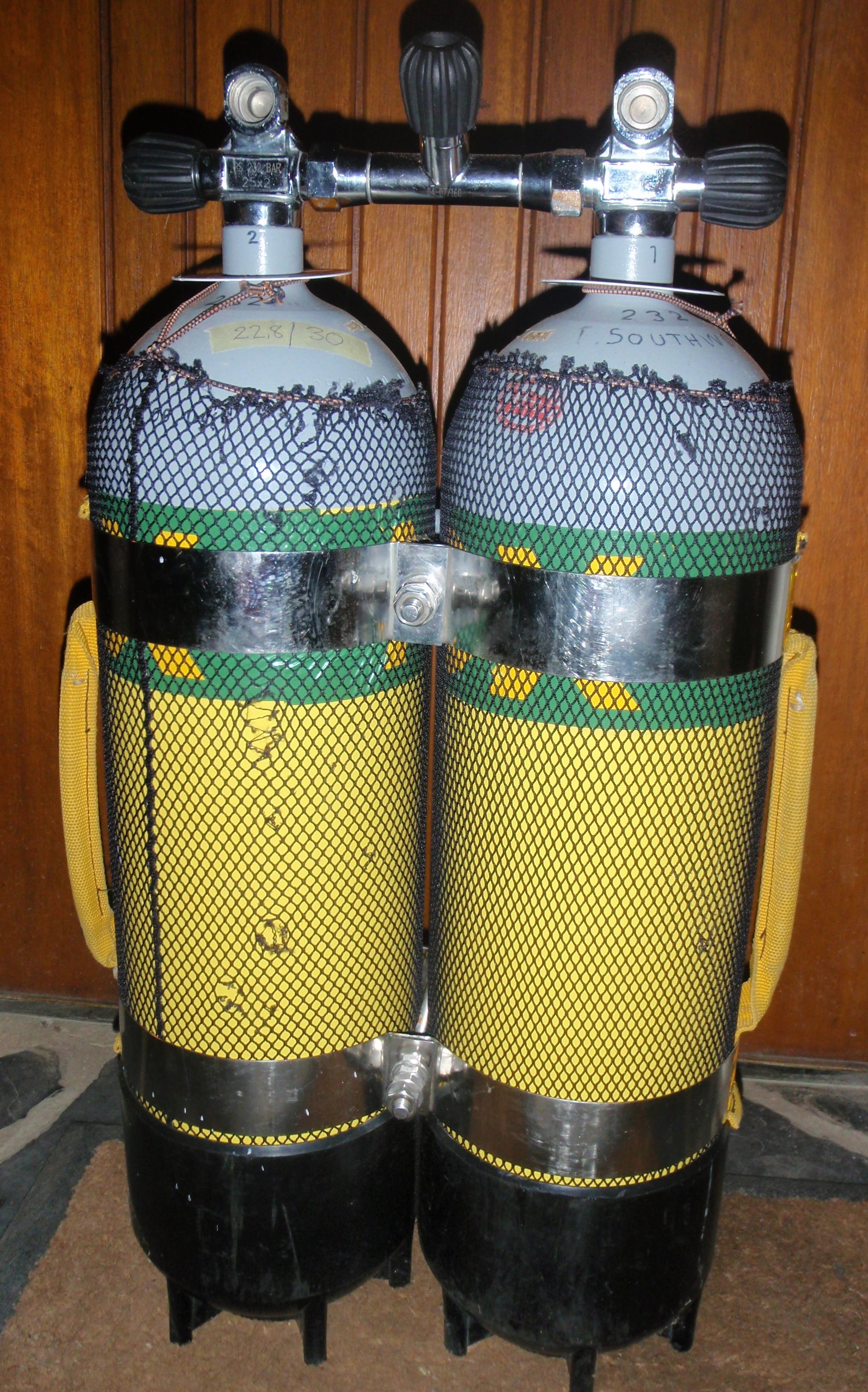
Manifolded twin 12l steel cylinders with isolation valve

A manifolded twin set with isolation valve is a special case. It is a redundant air supply when the isolation valve is closed, as the cylinders are then for most practical purposes independent, but not when it is open, as a leak will eventually drain both cylinders. Divers who intend to rely on a manifolded twin for bailout need to be able to isolate the cylinders quickly, as a major leak can drain a set in quite a short time. In comparison with independent twins, the manifolded set is less task loading through most of the dive, but requires skilled and immediate reaction in the event of a catastrophic failure, as it does not fail safe. If diving as part of a team, the risk is mitigated by the presence of buddies who can help. The position of the manifold valve is generally behind the middle of the shoulders, where it is moderately protected from bumping into the surroundings except when under an overhead, but is often very difficult for the diver to reach to operate, though this can be improved by correct fit of diving suit, stretching exercises, and practice.

=== Gas provided by another diver ===
Technically gas supplied by another diver is a fully redundant alternative breathing gas supply, as it is entirely independent of the diver, to the extent that it may not be available when needed due to the buddy not being there at the time. Gas may be provided by a buddy by any of the routes mentioned, and also by buddy breathing, the sharing of a single gas source by alternating use of the same demand valve with periods of not having gas available to breathe. The standard procedure is for th divers to each take two breath the pass the DV to the other. Buddy breathing generally uses the primary gas supply of the donor, but can also be done from stage, travel or decompression gas scuba sets carried by the buddy.

== Non-redundant alternative gas sources ==
These include a secondary regulator on a manifolded twin set without isolation valve, a secondary regulator on a double cylinder valve on a single cylinder, an auxiliary second stage on a single regulator (octopus regulator), and the pneumofathometer line for surface supplied divers.

The use of two independent regulators on independent cylinder valves supplied from the same cylinder is a system most applicable to cold-water diving, where a regulator can ice up and free flow, so the diver needs to be able to close the cylinder valve for that regulator, and fall back on a second regulator.

The pneumofathometer line on a surface supplied umbilical is a valuable backup supply in case of damage to the main supply hose, or if a diver needs to supply air to another diver on surface supply, as the usual configurations of helmet and full face mask do not allow buddy breathing of the conventional kind. The Pneumo line can be tucked into the neck dam or under the skirt of a full face mask, and provided the helmet or mask is not leaking heavily, will supply adequate air for an assisted ascent.

== See also ==
- Bailout bottle, also known as bailout cylinder – Emergency gas supply cylinder carried by a diver
- Buddy breathing – Technique for sharing breathing gas from a single mouthpiece
- Cave diving – Diving in water-filled caves
- Decompression (diving) – Pressure reduction and its effects during ascent from depth
- Diving cylinder – Container to supply high pressure gas for diving operations
- Diving equipment – Equipment used to facilitate underwater diving
- Diving regulator – Mechanism that controls the pressure of a breathing gas supply for diving
- Ice diving – Underwater diving under ice
- Professional diving – Underwater diving where divers are paid for their work
- Scuba skills – Skills required to scuba-dive safely
- Solo diving – Recreational diving without a dive buddy
- Surface-supplied diving – Underwater diving breathing gas supplied from the surface
- Technical diving – Diving beyond the scope of recreational diving
- Wreck diving – Recreational diving on wrecks
