= Buddy breathing =

Technique for sharing breathing gas from a single mouthpiece

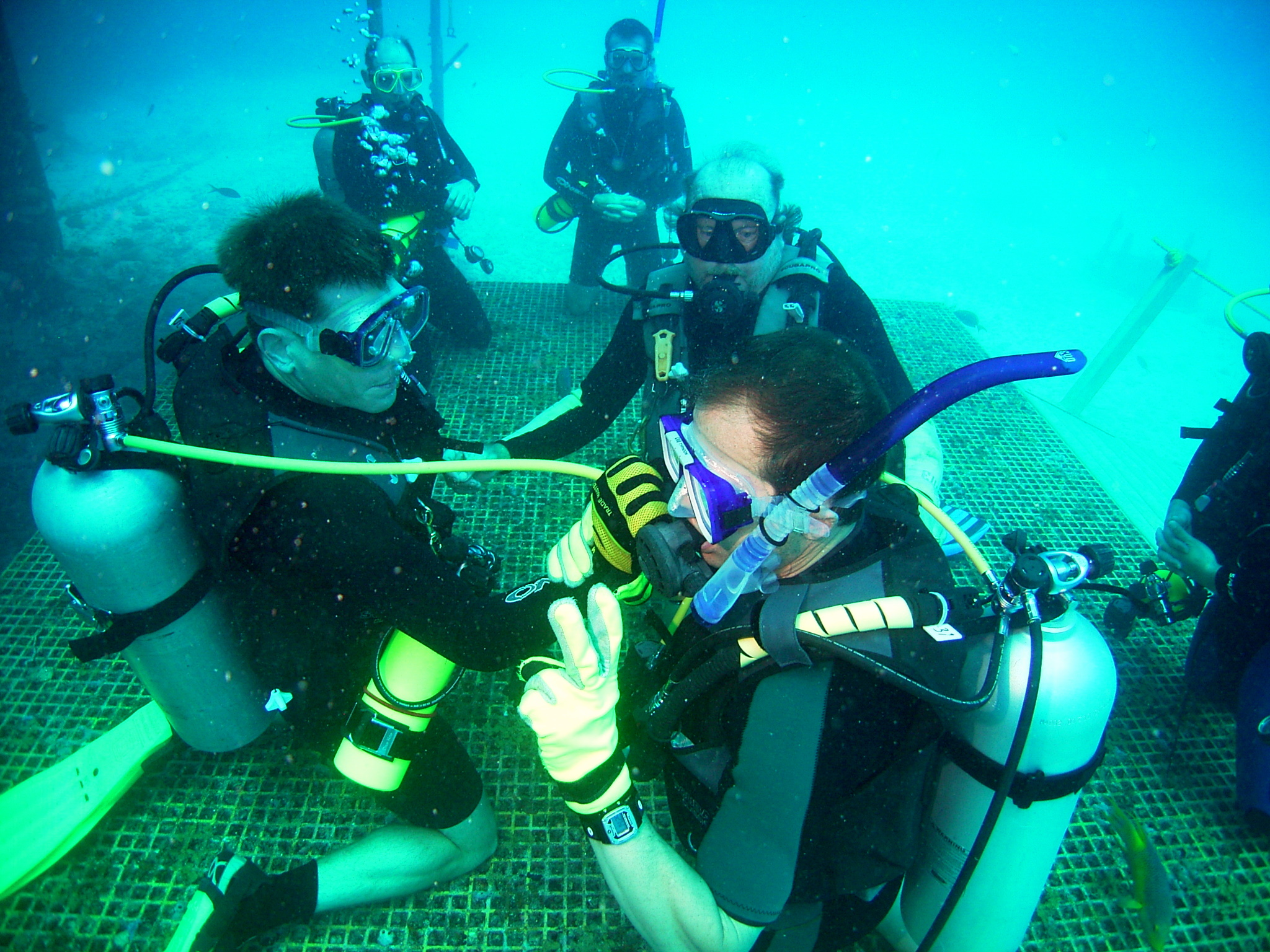
Scuba divers practicing buddy breathing technique during formal training

Buddy breathing is a rescue technique used in scuba diving "out-of-gas" emergencies, (Note: Also referred to as out-of-air emergencies, particularly in older references and by recreational divers, but can occur with any breathing gas) when two divers share one demand valve, alternately breathing from it. Techniques have been developed for buddy breathing from both twin-hose and single-hose regulators, but to a large extent it has been superseded by safer and more reliable techniques using additional equipment, such as the use of a bailout cylinder or breathing through a secondary demand valve on the rescuer's regulator.

Running out of breathing gas most commonly happens as a result of poor gas management, but it can also happen due to unforeseen exertion, stress, or breathing equipment failure. Equipment failure resulting in the loss of all gas could be caused by failure of a pressure retaining component such as an O-ring or hose in the regulator or, in cold conditions, a freezing of water in the regulator resulting in a freeflow from the demand valve. The need for buddy breathing can be avoided by use of alternative techniques and equipment.

Buddy breathing originated from military diving following a prohibition on the training and practice of free ascents. Minor variations on the basic technique were taught by different agencies at different times, and different techniques were needed for single hose and twin hose regulators. As buddy breathing has been found to require more intensive practice than is usually provided during entry level training to be reliably used in a real emergency without endangering the buddy, and more reliable alternatives are affordably available, the procedure has been deprecated by most recreational diver training agencies in favour of more reliable and safer alternatives which are quicker to learn, and where appropriate, emergency swimming ascent.

The term has also been used for air sharing between scuba divers using an octopus demand valve, and between firefighting breathing apparatus.

== Purpose ==
Buddy breathing is a procedure for emergency air sharing between two scuba divers which was developed as a response to an out-of-gas scuba diving emergency. An out-of-gas incident underwater is a life-threatening emergency. It may occur with very little warning and requires prompt and appropriate response of restoring access to safe breathing gas while it is possible. This implies either reaching the atmospheric free surface after an emergency ascent, where air is available in unlimited amounts, or to quickly gain access to some other source of suitable breathing gas while underwater before terminating the dive. For a scuba diver who is not carrying a suitable redundant breathing gas supply, this will be gas carried by another diver in the immediate vicinity, and the most likely source is a dive buddy, another scuba diver, who by agreement accompanies the diver closely enough for the pair to be able to assist each other in any reasonably foreseeable emergency. There are several ways that breathing gas may be shared between divers, and buddy breathing is the only one of them that only uses the most basic scuba equipment. (Note: The most basic scuba is a single cylinder with a single regulator and a single mouthpiece.) Out-of-gas incidents most commonly occur due to poor gas management, such as diving too deep or for too long, or expending too much effort and not sufficiently monitoring gas consumption, but it can also be caused by equipment failure leading to gas loss from leaks or freeflows.

== Technique ==
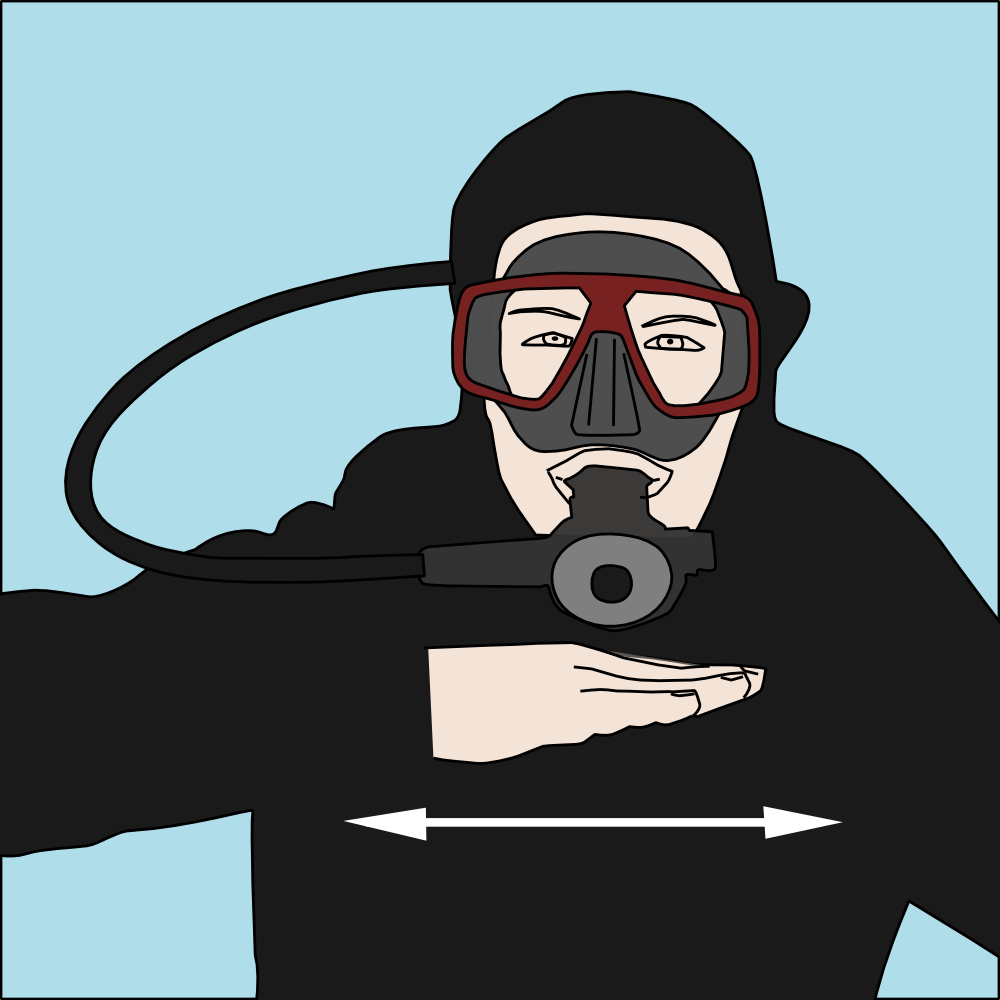
I'm out of air: cutting or chopping motion directed at throat with a flat hand

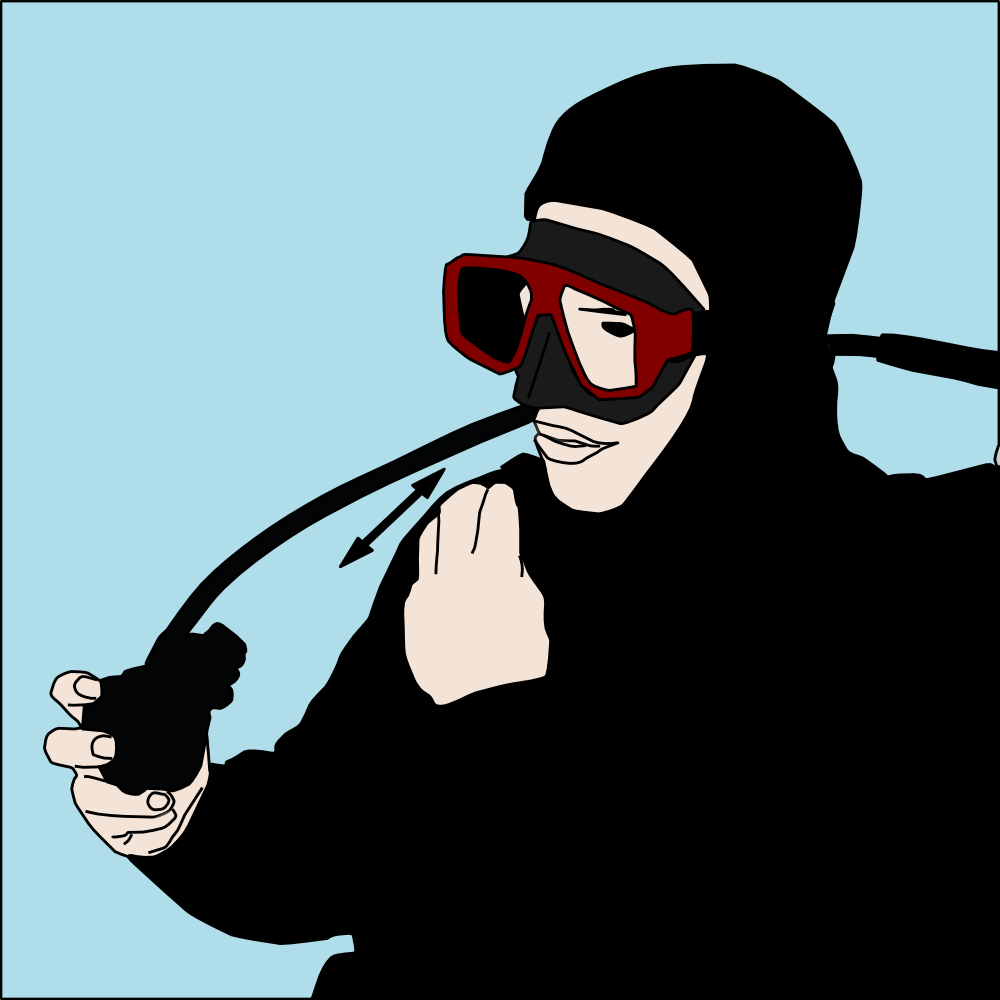
Give me air now (emergency implied): pointing to the mouth with thumb and fingers together, moving hand back and forth a short distance

Buddy breathing is usually initialised by the diver with the "out of air" emergency signalling this to another diver by a standard hand signal of a flat hand drawn across the throat or moved towards and away from the throat. This is followed by a "give me air" signal made by holding the fingers and thumb of one hand together, pointing them at the mouth and making repeated movements of the finger tips towards the mouth.

The donor is expected to take a good breath and pass their demand valve (or mouthpiece in the case of a twin-hose regulator) to the recipient, who is expected to take two good breaths and pass it back. In reality the recipient will often take more than two breaths, and the donor should expect this and relax to minimize metabolic rate. The donor should retain a good grip on the demand valve throughout the buddy breathing process, as a panicked recipient may fail to give it back. A reasonably reliable way of keeping control of the demand valve is to grasp the hose firmly in the fist where it connects to the demand valve. This provides good control but allows the recipient to use the purge button if needed.

A pattern of two breaths per diver should be established as soon as possible and then the dive is terminated and the ascent started as soon as possible, as air consumption from the shared cylinder while buddy breathing is usually more than double the normal rate, because the divers are likely to be stressed. Most demand valves will only drain correctly if the exhaust valve is at the bottom which puts the hose to the user's right, and in these cases the divers should align themselves to allow convenient movement of the demand valve from donor to recipient and back. When the divers need to ascend or swim horizontally while buddy breathing, it requires co-ordination and some skill, which is best practiced in a low-hazard environment. During ascent it is important not to hold one's breath as this could allow the gas in the lungs to expand sufficiently to cause lung over-expansion injury. The standard way of preventing this is to require the diver to be constantly blowing bubbles from the mouth when not actively inhaling, which keeps the airway open. The rate of bubble blowing, however, should not be so high as to leave no air to purge the demand valve before taking the next breath.

Buddy breathing is possible but difficult with most designs of full-face mask (FFM): If the recipient has a full-face mask and the donor has a standard scuba demand valve, the recipient has to remove their mask. Unless they have a backup half-mask their vision will be considerably impaired. Donating a FFM is impractical, and wearers carry an alternative gas source with a standard demand valve (DV) for gas sharing. A technique for air sharing between users of SCBA equipment with full-face masks using a low-pressure quick-connection system is also called buddy breathing.

== Training ==
A study by the UCLA Diving Safety Research Project suggests that about 20 successful repetitions of buddy breathing during training of entry level students are needed for a reasonable expectation of success without errors, and retesting after three months without reinforcing practice showed degraded performance and procedural errors. This is a higher level of training than provided by most recreational diver training organisations. For the skill to be reliable in an emergency, periodic reinforcement is necessary, and familiarisation is particularly valuable when buddies are to dive together for the first time.

== Hazards ==
Buddy breathing is one of the few scuba diving procedures in which the life of a diver can be endangered by the incompetence of another. Inadequate buddy breathing technique has resulted in the death of both divers on more than one occasion. The practice has been deprecated by most major recreational training agencies as requiring more practice than the skill is worth, considering that far more effective, safer, and easier to learn methods are available, at the cost of investing in additional equipment. The procedure requires the use of both hands to keep in position and guide the regulator, making buoyancy control during the ascent difficult, though buoyancy and depth control remains critical if there is a decompression obligation. The task loading is increased if one of the divers must operate a reel for a decompression or surface marker buoy, though this can also simplify control of buoyancy, ascent rate, and depth. The risk of regulator freeze in cold water is increased when the flow rate from a regulator is increased by two people using it, but this is not unique to buddy breathing, for example it is also a hazard of octopus breathing from the same first stage regulator.

== History ==
Buddy breathing originated from military diving following a prohibition on the training and practice of free ascents. Minor variations on the basic technique were taught by different agencies at different times, and different techniques were needed for single hose and twin hose regulators.

The procedure has been used since the beginnings of recreational diving, and along with the free ascent, it was one of the standard responses a diver could use if they ran out of air underwater. At that time twin-hose regulators were the norm, and it was reasonably easy for two divers to share the regulator mouthpiece while facing each other. Buddy breathing was an important skill before reserve valves and submersible pressure gauges were generally available, and running out of air was so common that it was not considered an emergency. By the mid-1960s the commercial availability of submersible pressure gauges made it possible to reliably monitor the remaining air supply, and it became less common to run out of air during a dive.

In the late 1960s single-hose regulators started to take over as the standard, and this complicated the buddy breathing procedure. The single-hose exhaust valve position at the bottom of most DVs made it necessary for the recipient to stay on the donor’s left when swimming side by side, or be offset slightly to the right when facing them. The standard procedure of continuous exhalation during ascent to avoid lung over-pressure injury could leave the diver with insufficient air to clear the regulator, as the single-hose demand valve would not normally free flow when raised above the head, so it was necessary to hold the DV in a way that did not obstruct the recipient from accessing the purge button. The increasing popularity of the buoyancy compensator was another complication, as it is necessary to periodically vent it during an ascent to avoid a runaway expansion of the contents and an uncontrolled buoyant ascent. This requires the use of one hand. The other is needed to control the regulator and hold on to the other diver, a moderately complex set of simultaneous tasks. It is possible to coordinate these activities, but this requires greater skill than with the original procedure, and therefore more intensive training to perform reliably. Since running out of air was becoming less common, the procedure was practiced less often, and skills generally deteriorated. The use of a secondary (octopus) second stage or a bailout cylinder removes the necessity for this complex and relatively stressful procedure.

In the 1990s there was also growing concern about the transmission of disease by sharing a mouthpiece, particularly as a better option (octopus breathing) was available at a reasonable cost. Dive Training magazine ran an article by Alex Brylske in November 1993 detailing the hazards of buddy breathing and the advantages of alternative systems, and over the following years the practice was phased out of most recreational diver training programmes in favour of the use of secondary second stages and where applicable, a controlled emergency swimming ascent. The most reliable alternative breathing gas supply, the bailout cylinder, has not yet significantly penetrated the recreational diving market, though it is standard equipment for solo diving and rebreather diving, and may be required for professional scuba divers in some circumstances.

== Alternatives ==
Buddy breathing is a specific type of emergency procedure used to avoid drowning or asphyxiation while underwater when the scuba breathing gas supply fails. It requires the assistance of another scuba diver with sufficient gas, compatible equipment and sufficient skill. Most recreational and professional diver training organisations consider relying on buddy breathing from a single regulator to be an unacceptable risk because other more reliable techniques and equipment exist. The technique needs training and regular practice by both divers if it is to be used successfully in a crisis; panic and task loading being the main reasons for it failing. The procedure has been criticised for endangering two people instead of one, particularly in situations in which one or both of the participants are not well-trained in the technique. The alternatives to buddy breathing are other gas sharing techniques with another scuba diver, and other actions which are not gas sharing techniques, such as emergency ascent, which can also be used to avoid drowning.

The generally accepted method for sharing breathing gas by recreational scuba divers is by using a second demand valve fitted to the primary or secondary diving regulator first stage, either from the primary scuba set or from an alternative scuba cylinder, for emergency use by another diver or themself. This is a safer and more reliable method of supplying emergency gas to a diver who is part of a planned team or buddy dive, and a solo diver is expected to carry their own emergency gas supply. There should never be a situation on a well planned and executed dive where two divers need to share a single demand valve, but the technique is still considered useful by some diving schools as it teaches control and hones skills under difficult circumstances, and it remains viable as a last resort.

Where a full-face mask is used, an emergency gas supply provided by a buddy or standby diver can be connected to the regulator on the mask by quick-connection couplings on the low pressure hoses.

Use of other emergency air sources also requires the learning of appropriate skills. These procedures are as complex as buddy breathing up to the point of sharing, and the fundamental difference is that the donor and recipient are not required to alternate breathing with a period when no gas is available, which can be a big advantage. These alternatives to buddy breathing also require substantial learning and reinforcement to be reliable in a stressful situation.

== Avoidance ==
In most cases the need for buddy-breathing or another gas-related emergency response is avoidable. The equipment is highly reliable when in good condition, and though occasionally breakdowns will occur without warning, in most cases user inspection and testing before the dive, combined with a planned maintenance schedule carried out by a competent person will pick up potential problems before they escalate to an emergency. Realistic gas planning and monitoring of the remaining gas supply in context of the time required to surface safely will prevent almost all out-of gas emergencies. Carrying a fully redundant emergency gas supply allows the diver to bail out independently of outside assistance if, in spite of all precautions, an emergency does occur.

== See also ==
- Alternative air source – Emergency supply of breathing gas for an underwater diver
- Bailout bottle – Emergency gas supply cylinder carried by a diver
- Buddy diving – Practice of mutual monitoring and assistance between two divers
- Buddy system – Procedure in which two people operate together as a single unit
- Emergency ascent – Ascent to the surface by a diver in an emergency
- Scuba gas management – Logistical aspects of scuba breathing gas
- Scuba gas planning – Estimation of breathing gas mixtures and quantities required for a planned dive profile
- Scuba skills – Skills required to scuba-dive safely
- Underwater diving emergency – Situation that endangers the life or health of a diver
