= Emergency ascent =

Ascent to the surface by a diver in an emergency

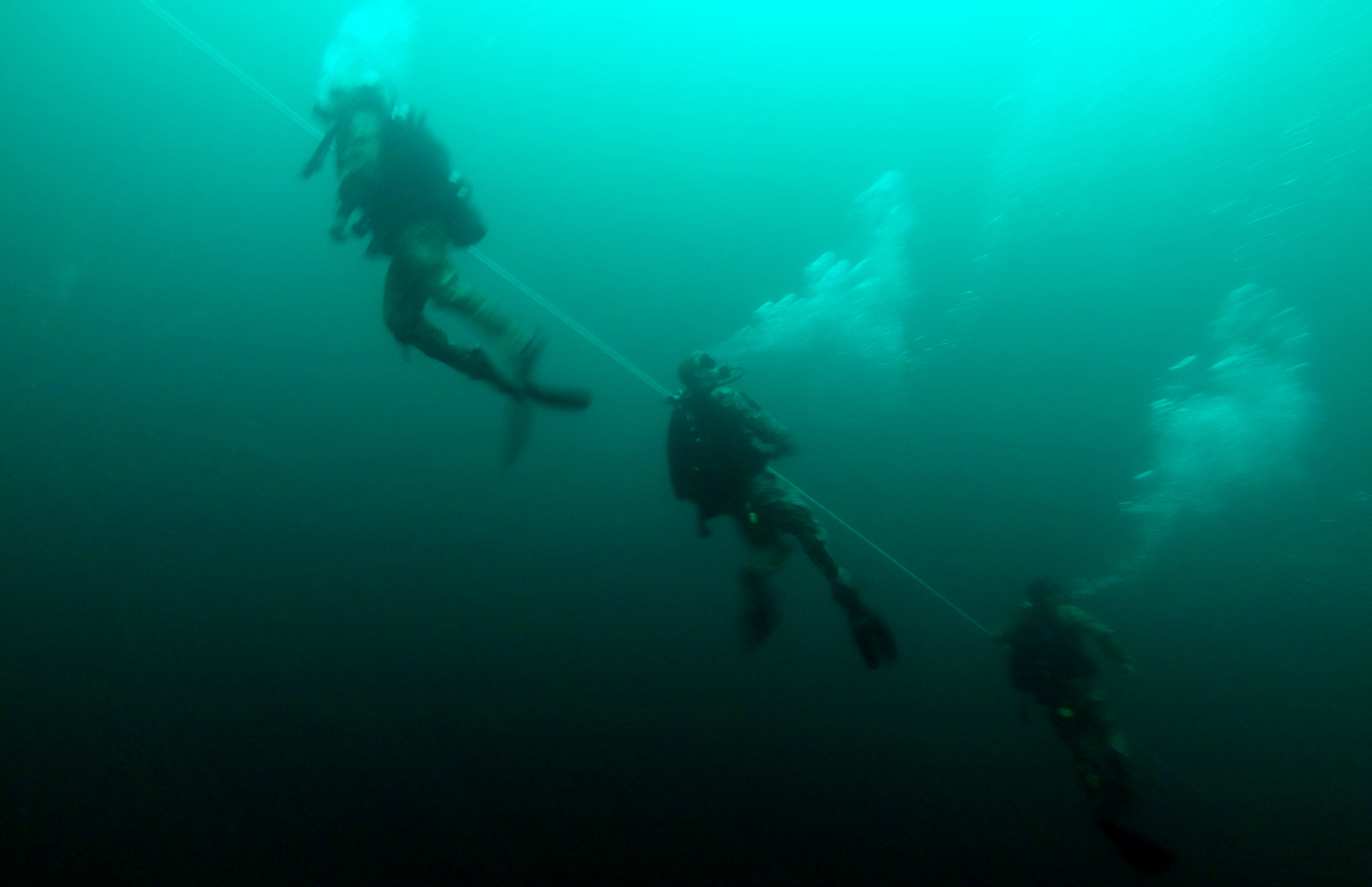
Alabama National Guard divers performing a controlled ascent during a training exercise

An emergency ascent is an ascent to the surface by a diver in an emergency. More specifically, it refers to any of several procedures for reaching the surface in the event of an out-of-gas emergency, generally while scuba diving.

Emergency ascents may be broadly categorised as independent ascents, where the diver is alone and manages the ascent by themself, and dependent ascents, where the diver is assisted by another diver, who generally provides breathing gas, but may also provide transportation or other assistance. The extreme case of a dependent ascent is underwater rescue or recovery of an unconscious or unresponsive diver, but this is more usually referred to as diver rescue, and emergency ascent is usually used for cases where the distressed diver is at least partially able to contribute to the management of the ascent.

There are three basic mechanisms for ascending through the water column: Positive buoyancy, hydrodynamic thrust, and force directed through a static external object. Any combination of these can be used.

An emergency ascent usually implies that the diver initiated the ascent voluntarily, and made the choice of the procedure. Ascents that are involuntary or get out of control unintentionally are more accurately classed as accidents. An emergency ascent may be made for any one of several reasons, including failure or imminent failure of the breathing gas supply.

== Reasons for making an emergency ascent ==
An emergency ascent implies that the dive plan has been abandoned due to circumstances beyond the control of the diver, though they may have been caused by the diver, as is often the case in out-of gas emergencies in scuba diving. Out of gas emergencies are generally the most urgent contingencies in diving, as the available time to deal with the emergency can be measured in minutes or seconds, while most other non-traumatic emergencies allow more time. Other reasons for emergency ascent may include:

- Failure of a rebreather requiring bailout to open circuit – This is not always considered an emergency ascent, though it is usually urgent, and is considered a sufficient reason to abort the dive.
- Compromise of diver buoyancy control due to loss of ballast weight.
  - Tethered-ascent – where the diver has unintentionally lost full control of buoyancy due to a loss of ballast weight, and controls ascent rate by use of a ratchet dive reel with the end of the reel line secured to the bottom.
- Lost buoyancy ascent – where the diver loses the ability to establish neutral or positive buoyancy without resorting to ditching weights. This can be due to a major buoyancy compensator failure or a major dry-suit flood.
- Injury or illness occurring during a dive may make an ascent for access to treatment urgent.
- Scuba equipment failure leading to non-catastrophic but rapid loss of breathing gas.
- Sudden loss of thermal protection due to dry suit leak or loss of heating water supply in a hot-water suit. The urgency of a dry suit leak depends on the rate of heat loss and how long the ascent will take, but a long decompression obligation can make it an emergency. Heating failure in a hot-water suit is generally more urgent and can be life-threatening.
- Inability to read instruments due to damage or loss of mask or severe damage to helmet faceplate. It may not be possible to accurately monitor depth, rate of ascent or decompression stops. This can be mitigated if a dive buddy can monitor control the ascent, or if the diver's computer has audible alarms for fast ascent and exceeding a ceiling. Ascent on a tangible reference such as a DSMB line, shotline or anchor line is also helpful.
- Flooding of helmet or full-face mask that cannot be rectified.
- Entanglement requiring abandonment of breathing apparatus.
- Entrapment of bell or failure of bell recovery system (SSDE).
- Entrapment of umbilical, or damage to umbilical resulting in main gas supply failure (SSDE).

== Techniques for achieving ascent ==
Three basic mechanisms are available which can cause a diver to ascend in the water. Any combination of these may be used, and the exact combination will depend on the circumstances of the emergency and to some extent, on the choice of the diver:

- Positive buoyancy is the imbalance of buoyancy forces on the diver and their equipment as a whole. The rate of ascent depends on the magnitude of the buoyant force and the drag force resisting upward motion. Buoyancy of the diver is controlled by adjusting the mass and volume of the diver and their equipment, and drag is a function of velocity and the shape and area of the diver passing through the water. A scuba diver should normally be able to achieve positive, neutral or negative buoyancy by adjusting their buoyancy control equipment, and should at all times be able to achieve positive buoyancy, either by adding gas volume or dropping ballast weight.
- Hydrodynamic thrust is the force imposed by swimming and finning. When directed downwards, and when sufficient to overcome any negative buoyancy, it will propel the diver upwards at a speed balanced by the drag.
- Upwards force caused by reaction to pulling or pushing downwards against an external object which can resist the force, that is sufficient to overcome any negative buoyancy.

== Techniques for slowing ascent ==
- Flare to increased drag
- Dump air from BCD or dry suit
- Hold onto the upline

== Terminology for emergency ascents ==
The terminology is diverse, and not always used consistently.

- Alternate air source ascent is an ascent in which the diver ascends breathing from an alternate air source regulator, either of their buddy or of their own gas supply. It is an ambiguous term, and is not necessarily an emergency ascent depending on which alternative air source is used, and may be independent or dependent also depending on whose gas supply is used. PADI use the term for an emergency ascent using air supplied by the buddy via an octopus DV.

=== Independent action ===
Emergency ascents where no assistance from another diver is given.

- Bailout ascent is an ascent where the diver breathes from their own bailout set carried to provide an emergency breathing gas supply for this kind of emergency.
- Blow and go is a free ascent where the diver exhales at the bottom before starting the ascent. The breath may be held during part of the ascent, as the lungs are emptied before starting. This procedure is considered unnecessarily hazardous by many recreational training agencies, and paradoxically has been implicated in a greater number of lung barotrauma incidents than other styles of free ascent. It may also make the diver negatively buoyant at the start of the ascent, necessitating greater effort to ascend, and reduces the oxygen reserves of the diver, making a loss of consciousness due to hypoxia during the ascent more likely.
- Buoyant ascent is any ascent where the diver is propelled towards the surface by positive buoyancy.
- Buoyant emergency ascent is an ascent where the diver achieves positive buoyancy by ditching some or all of their ballast weight. It is usually irreversible, and often the ascent rate is only partly controllable.
- Closed circuit bailout is bailout to a second rebreather carried for this purpose.
- Controlled emergency swimming ascent (CESA) is an emergency swimming ascent which remains under control and which is performed at a safe ascent rate, with continuous exhalation at a rate unlikely to cause injury to the diver by lung overexpansion. The second stage regulator is retained in the mouth and may be breathed off if gas becomes available as the ambient pressure drops.
- Emergency free ascent (EFA) is like a controlled emergency swimming ascent without a regulator in the mouth. It is considered unacceptably hazardous for training purposes by some agencies.
- Emergency swimming ascent (ESA) is a free ascent where the diver swims to the surface at either negative or approximately neutral buoyancy.
- Exhaling ascent is an ascent where the diver continuously exhales at a controlled rate during the ascent. This may apply to an emergency swimming ascent/free ascent or a controlled emergency swimming ascent, and distinguishes it from a blow and go procedure.
- Free ascent is the name of the procedure used in US Navy submarine escape training. However the term is also used for other emergency diver ascent procedures where breathing gas is not available to the diver during the ascent. Free ascent basically implies that no additional breathing gas is available during the ascent, in much the same way that freediving implies that no additional breathing gas is available during the dive.
- Open circuit bailout is a change from breathing off the rebreather loop to open circuit, either by physically changing from the rebreather dive/surface valve to an open circuit bailout demand valve, or by switching the rebreather bailout valve from closed to open circuit. This action is taken both when there is a recoverable problem with the rebreather loop, in which case once the problem has been corrected, a reversion to closed circuit is usual, or when the loop has failed irrecoverably, in which case an ascent is made on open circuit, which is generally regarded as an emergency ascent.
- Reserve air ascent is an ascent using the gas in the main cylinder after actuating a reserve valve to release the gas trapped by the reserve valve mechanism. A reserve air ascent is not traditionally considered an emergency ascent, as it was the standard procedure before the use of submersible pressure gauges became widespread.

=== Dependent action ===
Ascent in an emergency with assistance provided by another diver.

- Buddy breathing ascent is where the diver is provided with breathing gas during the ascent from the same demand valve (second stage regulator) as the donor, and they breathe alternately.
- Assisted ascent, sometimes octopus assisted ascent is where the diver is provided with breathing gas during the ascent by another diver via a demand valve other than the one in use by the donor during the ascent. This may be supplied from the same or a different cylinder, and from the same or a separate 1st stage regulator. The divers' breathing is not constrained by each other, and they may breathe simultaneously.

== Training policies of various certification agencies ==
Few issues of diver training have been more controversial than the teaching of emergency ascent procedures. The controversy centers on techniques, psychological and physiological considerations, concern about today's legal climate, and finally the moral issue: is it wise and ethical to train divers in emergency ascent techniques, even though this training may itself be hazardous?
Ronald C. Samson & James W. Miller, 1977

Emergency ascent training policy differs considerably among the certification agencies, and has been the subject of some controversy regarding risk-benefit.

=== NSTC agreement ===
In 1977 a formal policy regarding training of emergency ascent procedures was adopted by five major American recreational diver certification agencies: NASDS, NAUI, PADI, SSI and YMCA.

This policy is a general agreement that emergency ascent training is worth the risk on ethical grounds, and recommends those procedures which the agencies consider most appropriate for teaching recreational divers. It does not prescribe training procedures or standards.

This National Scuba Training Committee Ascent Training Agreement recognises that there are a number of options available to the scuba diver in the event of a sudden apparent termination of breathing gas supply at depth, and that the selection of an acceptable response is dependent on several variables, including: depth, visibility, distance from other divers, the nature of the underwater activity, available breath-hold time, training and current competence of the involved divers, stress levels of the divers, obstructions to a direct access to the surface, water movement, equipment, buoyancy, familiarity between divers of procedures and equipment, apparent reasons for air loss and decompression obligations.

Recommendations for training:

- The agreement requires scuba instructors to make students aware of the variables and how they affect the choice of an appropriate response.
- Training should allow divers trained by different instructors to make similar appropriate decisions under the same circumstances, and should provide divers with safe and effective emergency procedures for an out of air situations when not under supervision of an instructor.
- Divers should be taught to agree on emergency procedures before the dive when intending to dive together.

Recommendations for choice of procedure:

- The most desirable option in the dependent category is given as the octopus assisted ascent, where the out-of-air diver is provided breathing gas by a donor via a secondary (octopus) second stage.
- Buddy breathing by two divers on a single second stage is specified as the least desirable of the dependent options.
- The recommended independent option is the emergency swimming ascent, where the diver swims to the surface at roughly neutral buoyancy, while exhaling continuously.
- The final option is a buoyant ascent, where buoyancy is gained by inflation of the buoyancy compensator (not always possible in an out-of-air emergency), and dropping of weights. This is recommended as a last resort where the diver is unsure of making it to the surface by swimming, as it will ensure that an unconscious diver will rise to the surface rather than sink.

No other procedures are recommended in this agreement, though the use of a bailout cylinder may be considered effectively equivalent to either octopus assisted ascent, when gas is supplied by a donor, or not actually running out of gas if it is the diver's own bailout set.

=== SSAC ===
The Scottish Sub-Aqua Club holds that training is primarily to deal with potential emergencies and that it should be practical rather than purely theoretical. This implies that it is better to have some practical experience of ability to cope with a simulated emergency situation as this gives greater insight and confidence, as well as proven ability, provided that the risk in training is appreciably smaller than the risk in not being trained.

The SSAC trains open water free ascent from a maximum depth of 6–7 m, initially using a shot line to control ascent rate, and considers the risk small and the benefit significant in view of their statistics which showed an incidence of roughly 16 free ascents per 10,000 dives.

In 1978 the SSAC recommended responses to an air supply failure, in order of preference, were:

- making use of a companion's octopus rig;
- then by breathing from an ABLJ;
- then by a shared ascent (buddy breathing from a single second stage) and;
- as a last resort, by free ascent.

=== CMAS ===
The only reference to emergency ascent training in the CMAS Diver Training Program (CMAS TC Version 9/2002) is in the 1-star course where Controlled buoyancy lift of victim to surface is specified under practical training of rescue skills.

=== Commercial and scientific diving ===
Use of a bailout cylinder is the primary source of emergency breathing gas recommended by several codes of practice for scientific and commercial divers. Pneumo gas supplied either from the diver's own pneumofathometer line or from the standby diver's pneumo line in a rescue are also recognised emergency gas sources for surface-supplied divers, and can be used during an emergency ascent.

== Choice of procedure ==
- The scuba diver perceives an out of air emergency.
- An option is chosen:
  - If a bailout cylinder is carried, the diver switches to personal bailout gas and makes a normal ascent.
  - If the diver is not carrying a bailout cylinder, and another diver is in the immediate vicinity, the diver may request gas from the other diver.
    - If the other diver has the gas available and is both willing and competent to provide it, the donor provides emergency gas and the two divers make an assisted emergency ascent while sharing gas using a single demand valve or octopus demand valve, or supplying the receiver from the donor's bailout set.
    - If the other diver does not help, the distressed diver must make an unassisted emergency ascent.
  - If there is no other diver in the immediate vicinity, the diver must make an unassisted emergency ascent.
  - If the diver judges the risk of an unassisted emergency ascent to be sufficiently low, or relatively low compared to the other available options, he/she may choose to do an unassisted emergency ascent although other options may technically exist.

When there is no physical or physiological constraint (such as excessive depth, a physical overhead or a decompression obligation) preventing a direct ascent to the surface, an unassisted emergency ascent may be the lowest risk option, as it eliminates the unknowns associated with finding and requesting aid from another diver. These unknowns may be minimised by training, practice, prior agreement, and adherence to suitable protocols regarding equipment, planning, dive procedures and communication.

== Scuba procedures ==
=== Ascent while breathing from the buoyancy compensator ===
An alternative emergency breathing air source may be available via the buoyancy compensator. There are two possibilities for this:

1. If the buoyancy compensator has an inflation gas supply from an independent, dedicated cylinder, this gas can be breathed by the diver by using the inflation valves and the oral inflation mouthpiece. BC inflation cylinders are neither common, nor usually very large, so the amount of air will be small and generally insufficient for staged decompression, but a few breaths on the way up can make a big difference to the stress level of the diver, and may prevent loss of consciousness.
2. If the buoyancy compensator is supplied from the breathing gas cylinder which has stopped supplying gas, the volume available will be extremely limited, but it will expand during ascent, and instead of dumping it to reduce excess buoyancy, it may be breathed by the diver. Using this gas will affect buoyancy. Anyone who considers this as an option should ensure that the interior of the BC is decontaminated before use, as it is an environment in which pathogens may breed.

=== Buoyant ascent ===
Ascent where the diver is propelled towards the surface by positive buoyancy. Generally recommended as a last resort, though a sufficiently skilled diver could control ascent rate by precise dumping from the BC and use this as a low energy alternative to a swimming ascent. In this case weights should not be ditched during the ascent.

Positive buoyancy may be established by inflation of the BC or dry suit, or by ditching weights. Buoyancy from added gas requires inflation gas to be available, so may not be possible in an out-of-gas emergency. Buoyancy can be reduced during ascent by dumping, but the effect of ditched weights is not reversible, and usually increases as the surface is approached, particularly if a thick wetsuit is worn. If weight can be ditched partially, this may be a better option, unless the diver feels that he is about to lose consciousness, in which case a substantial increase in buoyancy may be better.

A method of buoyancy control which will automatically jettison weights if the diver loses consciousness during the ascent is to take them off and hold them in a hand while surfacing. If the diver loses consciousness, the weights will drop and positive buoyancy will take the diver the rest of the way to the surface.

=== Buoy assisted ascent or climbing the upline ===
A diver who cannot establish controllable positive buoyancy may be able to use a surface buoy or buoyant object to assist and control ascent. For example, climbing an anchor line or shotline, or surface marker buoy tether, or deploying an inflatable decompression buoy of sufficient buoyancy to support the diver in midwater and then reeling in the line to pull the diver up at a controlled rate. In these cases in may be difficult to establish positive buoyancy at the surface without ditching weight, but at that stage the risks associated with positive buoyancy no longer apply.

=== Controlled emergency swimming ascent (CESA) ===
Controlled emergency swimming ascent is a technique used by scuba divers as an emergency procedure when a diver has run out of breathing gas in shallow water and must return to the surface. During the ascent, the diver propels themself towards the surface at a safe ascent rate by means of swimming, usually finning, with continuous exhalation at a rate unlikely to cause injury to the diver by lung overexpansion, and remains under control.

The technique involves simply ascending at a controlled pace, typically about 18 metres (60 feet) per minute, while exhaling slowly. As the diver ascends, the air in the lungs expands as surrounding water pressure decreases. Exhaling allows excess volume to escape from the lungs, and by exhaling at a suitable rate the diver can continue exhaling throughout the ascent and still have air in their lungs at the surface. If the diver fails to exhale during the ascent, lung over-expansion injury is likely to occur. If exhalation is limited to relaxing and allowing the expanding gas to escape without effort, there should not be a feeling of running out of breath, as the air inhaled at depth expands during the ascent and the lung volume should remain nearly constant.

This procedure is recommended for ascents where there is no decompression obligation, a free surface with little risk of entanglement, and the diver has sufficient breath hold capacity to easily reach the surface conscious.

Advantages of this method, when applicable, are that no outside assistance or special equipment is required. Disadvantages are that it requires the diver to reach the surface in a limited time, which does not allow for staged decompression, possible delays due to entanglement or snags, or long distances to reach the surface. It also requires the diver to produce propulsive effort, which reduces potential endurance on the single breath or limited gas available.

Use of the continuous exhalation procedure from moderately (neutrally or relaxed) inflated lungs combines the advantages of lower risk of lung injury compared to either full or empty lungs with improved endurance due to more available oxygen. Keeping the DV in the mouth and attempting to breathe normally or slowly from it may provide additional breaths as the ambient pressure reduces, and helps ensure that the airways remain open. A large cylinder may provide several additional breaths during ascent if the regulator is functioning correctly. On a 30 m ascent, a 12-litre cylinder will provide 36 litres of additional free air, distributed at ambient pressure in proportion to the change in ambient pressure.

If the diver is neutrally buoyant at the time that the ascent is initiated, the amount of energy required to reach the surface will be minimised, and frequent controlled venting of the buoyancy compensator can keep the ascent rate under fine control.

While in a practical sense there is little difference between a CESA and a "free ascent" (aka Emergency Swimming Ascent or ESA), the technical difference between the two is that in a CESA the regulator second stage is retained in the mouth and the diver exhales through it (in case gas becomes available due to the drop in ambient pressure) while in free ascent, the regulator is not retained or there is no regulator available, and the diver exhales directly into the water.

=== Buddy breathing ascent ===
Ascent during which the diver is provided with breathing gas from the same demand valve (second stage regulator) as the donor, and they breathe alternately. The out-of air diver must attract the attention of a nearby diver and request to share air. If the chosen donor has sufficient gas, and is competent to share by this method, an emergency ascent may be accomplished safely. Accurate buoyancy control is still required, and the stress of controlling the ascent rate and maintaining the breathing procedure can be more than some divers can handle. There have been occurrences of uncontrolled ascent and panic, in some cases with fatal consequences to both divers. This procedure is best suited to divers who are well acquainted with each other, well practiced in the procedure, and highly competent in buoyancy control and ascent rate control. In most circumstances analysis of the risk would indicate that the divers should have an alternative breathing gas source in preference to relying on buddy breathing. Failure to provide alternative breathing gas without good reason would probably be considered negligent in professional diving.

=== Assisted ascent ===
Also known as octopus assisted ascent, assisted ascent is an emergency ascent during which the diver is provided with breathing gas by another diver via a demand valve other than the one in use by the donor during the ascent. This may be supplied from the same or a different cylinder, and from the same or a separate 1st stage regulator. The divers' breathing patterns are not constrained by each other, and they may breathe simultaneously. Task loading is reduced in comparison with buddy breathing, and the divers can concentrate on controlling the ascent. If the gas is supplied from an independent cylinder, the cylinder can be handed off to the out-of-gas diver, if there is a good reason to do so and this does not adversely affect buoyancy control and trim of either diver.

=== Lifeline assisted ascent ===
An ascent where the diver is pulled to the surface by the line tender, either as a response to an emergency signal from the diver, or a failure to respond to signals from the surface. A diver may also be assisted in the ascent by the line tender in a normal ascent, particularly divers in standard dress, where it was often the normal operating procedure.

=== Controlled buoyant lift ===
The controlled buoyant lift is an underwater diver rescue technique used by scuba divers to safely raise an incapacitated diver to the surface from depth. It is the primary technique for rescuing an unconscious diver from the bottom. It can also be used where the distressed diver has lost or damaged their diving mask and cannot safely ascend without help, though in this case the assisted diver would normally be able to control their own buoyancy.

The standard PADI-trained technique is for the rescuer to approach the face-down unconscious diver (victim) from above and kneel with one knee either side of their diving cylinder. Then, with the victim's diving regulator held in place, the tank is gripped firmly between the knees and the rescuer's buoyancy compensator is used to control a slow ascent to the surface. This method may not work with sidemount or twin cylinder sets, and puts both rescuer and victim at increased risk if the rescuer loses grip, as the victim will sink and the rescuer may make an excessively fast uncontrolled ascent.

In the technique taught by BSAC and some other agencies, the rescuer faces the casualty and uses the casualty's buoyancy compensator to provide buoyancy for both divers as the rescuer makes a controlled ascent. If the casualty is not breathing, the ascent will be urgent. If the two divers separate during the ascent, the use of the casualty's buoyancy is intended as a failsafe causing the casualty to continue to the surface where there is air and other rescuers can help. The rescuer will be negative at this point, but this is generally easily compensated by finning and corrected by inflation of the rescuer's BC. This method does not usually require additional inflation of the lifting BCD during the ascent, so if the casualty's air supply is exhausted at the start of the ascent, the rescuer can orally inflate the casualty's BCD at the start and provided the do not dump excessively it will suffice for the lift.

=== Tethered ascent ===
Ascent controlled by a line attached to the diver and to a fixed point at the bottom, with the line paid out by the diver to control depth and rate of ascent when the diver has inadvertently lost full control of buoyancy due to loss of ballast weight, so cannot attain neutral buoyancy at some point during the ascent, and needs to do decompression. CMAS require this skill for their Self-Rescue Diver certification, using a ratchet reel to control the line, though other methods may be feasible. The diver must ensure that gas can be released from the buoyancy compensator and dry suit, if applicable, throughout the ascent, to avoid aggravating the problem by trapped gas expansion. This basically requires the diver to ascend with the feet down and dump valves up, an orientation which can be achieved by hooking a leg around the line. Clipping the reel to the harness should prevent accidentally losing the reel during the ascent. Depending on how the line is attached at the bottom, it may be necessary to cut loose and abandon the line after surfacing.

== Surface supplied procedures ==
=== Ascent on bailout gas ===
The diver opens the bailout valve on the helmet, bandmask or harness mounted bailout block. This opens the supply of breathing gas from the bailout cylinder carried by the diver to the demand valve of the breathing apparatus. The bailout gas volume carried by the diver is usually required to be sufficient to return to a place of safety where more gas is available, such as the surface, diving stage or wet or dry bell.

=== Ascent on pneumo air ===
Another option for the surface supplied diver is to breathe air supplied through the pneumofathometer hose of the umbilical. The diver inserts the hose into the air space of the helmet of full face mask, and the panel operator opens the supply valve sufficiently to provide enough air to breathe on free flow. Pneumo air can be supplied to another diver by a rescuer in the surface supply equivalent of octopus air sharing. This procedure would save the bailout gas which would then be available if the situation deteriorates further. Pneumo breathing air supply is not applicable to environmentally sealed suits for contaminated environments.

=== Bell or stage abandonment ===
In the event that a wet bell or stage cannot be recovered from a dive on schedule, it may be necessary for the divers to abandon it and make an autonomous ascent. This may be complicated by decompression obligations or compromised breathing gas supply, and may involve the assistance of a surface standby diver. The procedure depends on whether the divers' breathing gas is supplied directly from the surface (type 1 wet bell) or is supplied from a gas panel in the bell, via the bell umbilical (type 2 wet bell).

To abandon a type 1 wet bell or stage, the divers simply exit the bell on the side that the umbilicals enter, ensuring that they are not looped around anything. This is reliably done by having the surface tender take up slack while returning to the bell and following the umbilical out the other side, after which the tender can simply raise the diver as if there were no bell.

On a type 2 bell, the divers' umbilicals are connected to the gas panel in the bell, and the procedure used should minimise the risk of the umbilical snagging during the ascent and forcing the diver to descend again to free it. If the diver excursion umbilical is not long enough to allow the diver to reach the surface, the standby diver will have to disconnect the bell diver's umbilical, and the rest of the ascent may be done on bailout, pneumo supply from the standby diver, or the standby diver can connect a replacement umbilical.

== Saturation diving ==
The only viable form of emergency ascent by a saturation diver is inside a closed and pressurised bell. This can be in the form of an emergency recovery of the original bell, or by through water transfer to another bell at depth. A form of unassisted emergency ascent for a bell with functioning lock and external ballast, is to release the ballast from inside the sealed bell, allowing inherent buoyancy to lift the bell to the surface.

== Hazards ==
=== Lung overpressure accidents ===
The most direct and well publicised hazard is lung overpressure due to either a failure on the part of the diver to allow the expanding air in the lungs to escape harmlessly, or entrapment of air due to circumstances beyond the control of the diver. Lung overpressure can lead to fatal or disabling injury, and can occur during training exercises, even when reasonable precautions have been taken. There is some evidence that a full exhalation at the start of the ascent in the "blow and go" scenario, can lead to partial collapse of some of the smaller air passages, and that these can then trap air during the ascent sufficiently to cause tissue rupture and air embolism. The procedure of slowly letting the air escape during ascent can also be taken too far, and not allow the air to escape fast enough, with similar consequences. Attempting to breathe off the empty cylinder is one way of potentially avoiding these problems, as this has the double advantage of keeping the airways open more reliably, and in most cases allowing the diver several more breaths during the ascent as the reduced ambient pressure allows more of the residual cylinder air to pass through the regulator and become available to the diver. A 10-litre cylinder ascending 10 metres will produce an extra 10 litres of free air (reduced to atmospheric pressure). At a tidal volume of about 1 litre this would give several breaths during ascent, with increased effectiveness nearer the surface. Of course this air is not available in some cases, such as a rolled off cylinder valve, burst hose, blown o-ring, or lost second stage, where the failure is not simply breathing all the air down to the pressure where the regulator stops delivering, but if it is possible, the demand valve can be kept in the mouth and the diver can continue to attempt to breathe from it during an emergency ascent. If the diver has healthy lungs and the airway remains open throughout the ascent, rate of ascent does not significantly affect risk of lung barotrauma, but it does affect risk of decompression sickness.

=== Loss of consciousness due to hypoxia ===
One of the dangers of a free ascent is hypoxia due to using up the available oxygen during the ascent. This can be aggravated if the diver fully exhales at the start of the ascent in the "blow and go" technique, if the diver is so heavy that swimming upwards requires strong exertion, or if the diver is already stressed and short of breath when the air supply is lost. Loss of consciousness during ascent is likely to lead to drowning, particularly if the unconscious diver is negatively buoyant at that point and sinks. On the other hand, a fit diver leaving the bottom with a moderate lungful of air, relatively unstressed, and not overexerted, will usually have sufficient oxygen available to reach the surface conscious by direct swimming ascent with constant exhalation at a reasonable rate of between 9 and 18 metres per minute from recreational diving depths (30 m or less), provided their buoyancy is close to neutral at the bottom.

=== Decompression sickness ===
The risk of decompression sickness during an emergency ascent is probably no greater than the risk during a normal ascent at the same ascent rate after the same dive profile. In effect, the same ascent rate and decompression profile should be applied in an emergency ascent as in a normal ascent, and if there is a decompression requirement in the planned dive, steps should be taken to mitigate the risk if having to make an ascent without stops. The most straightforward and obviously effective method is for the diver to carry a bailout set sufficient to allow the planned ascent profile if the primary gas supply fails. This makes each diver independent on the availability of air from a buddy, but may cause extra task loading and physical loading of the diver due to the extra equipment needed. This method is extensively used by commercial and scientific divers, solo recreational divers, and some technical and recreational divers who prefer self-reliance. When all else fails, the consequences of missing some decompression time are usually less severe than death by drowning.

=== Drowning ===
Drowning is the most likely consequence of a failure to reach the surface during an independent emergency ascent, and is a significant risk even if the diver reaches the surface if he or she loses consciousness on the way.

== Mitigation of hazards ==
- The most generally effective method is for each diver to carry an independent bailout set sufficient to safely reach the surface, after completing all required decompression for the planned dive profile. This is relatively expensive and many recreational divers have never been trained in this skill, so there may be unacceptable additional task loading to carry and use the equipment.
- An economical and effective method of reducing risk while sharing air is use of secondary (octopus) demand valves. This is effective only if the buddy is available for sharing at the time of the emergency.
- If it is possible, the demand valve can be kept in the mouth and the diver can continue to attempt to breathe from it during a free ascent.
- If the diver is in reasonable doubt of remaining conscious all the way to the surface, positive buoyancy provided by either suit or BC inflation, or by shedding weights can ensure that if the diver does lose consciousness, they will at least float to the surface, where there is a better chance of rescue than sinking back to the bottom and almost certainly drowning.
- Diving in teams of two or three divers who are adequately trained and equipped with similar equipment so that emergency procedures are facilitated, and ensuring that the team are always close enough to respond in time to an emergency.
- The diver should not waste time while making the choice of which emergency ascent procedure to use. A controlled swimming ascent is the most recommended default for recreational diving. Divers who venture beyond the safe zone for controlled swimming ascent should be prepared for their most appropriate option at all times.
- Some lung pathologies increase the risk of lung overpressure injury significantly. Divers can inform themselves of these increased risks by undergoing appropriate medical examinations.
- In the event that a free ascent is required, the lung volume should neither be too large nor too small, as both extremes increase the risk of injury. A volume within the normal relaxed range should be suitable. Forceful exhalation before ascent increases the risk of lung injury, and reduces the available oxygen.
- Pre-dive discussions and checks to ensure that all members of the dive team are aware of and agree with the procedures to be used if there is an emergency during the dive, and that they are all familiar with the equipment and equipment configuration of all members of the team.
- Adequate emergency ascent procedure training, and sufficient practice to remain adept in the requisite skills.
- During octopus assisted or buddy breathing ascents, divers should remain in close contact, and keep control of their buoyancy.
- A first stage regulator which is to be used with an octopus demand valve should be able to supply the required flow rate without freezing up if the water is cold.

== Freediving ==
In freediving the usual emergency ascent involves ditching the diver's weightbelt or drop weights to increase buoyancy and reduce the effort required. This generally establishes positive buoyancy and gives the diver a chance of not drowning if they lose consciousness before reaching the surface and are assisted by another diver, or are lucky enough to float face upwards and draw a breath.
