= Underwater diving emergency =

Situation that endangers the life or health of a diver

A diving emergency or underwater diving emergency is an emergency that involves an underwater diver. The nature of an emergency requires action to be taken to prevent or avoid death, injury, or serious damage to property or the environment. In the case of diving emergencies, the risk is generally of death or injury to the diver, while diving or in the water before or after diving.

Underwater diving is an activity in which there is a constant risk of an emergency developing. This is a situation common to many human activities. The diver survives in an inherently hostile environment by competence, suitable equipment, vigilance, and attention to detail at a level appropriate to the specific situation. The emergency is the stage of an accident or incident between the causes and the effects, often while it is still possible to take effective action to rectify or mitigate the situation. Like many other classes of emergency, diving emergencies can often be prevented from developing further by appropriate action at an early stage, and by having the appropriate skills and equipment. Professional diving teams are required to have emergency plans in place during all operations, and recreational divers are also expected to do so, to the extent appropriate to the dive plan.

An alternative meaning, in the context of medicine, is a medical emergency which was initiated while diving, which may also be described as a diving medical emergency.

== Scope and definition ==
A diving emergency is an emergency experienced by a diver during a dive. This includes the time from when the diver enters the water to dive, until the end of all decompression and the diver has exited the water. Surface decompression may legally be part of a dive. It includes but is not restricted to medical emergencies that are a consequence of diving incidents.

- An emergency is an unexpected and often unforeseen set of circumstances or the consequences thereof that require immediate action, or an urgent requirement for assistance or relief.
- The human activity of underwater diving is the practice of descending below the water's surface to interact with the environment. It is also often referred to as diving, an ambiguous term with several possible meanings, depending on context.
- Diving emergencies can be grouped as incidents that can be managed by the diver without assistance, and those which require assistance by another diver, the dive team or an outside party.
- Diving emergencies can also be distinguished by the mode of diving, so a distinction can be made between scuba diving emergencies and freediving emergencies, surface-oriented surface-supplied diving emergencies and saturation diving emergencies, and open circuit and rebreather emergencies, as some emergencies are only possible when diving in a specific mode, (equipment failure or misuse is only possible for equipment actually in use) and for others the risk is strongly influenced by the mode.

== Types and causes ==
Many circumstances can lead to a diving emergency. Many events may be considered an emergency under some conditions, but not under other conditions, where what would be an emergency to the unprepared diver can be an inconvenience when adequately prepared. Most of them can be mitigated before they become a full emergency,

=== Types ===
- Life support emergencies
- Decompression emergencies
- Incapacitation
- Acute medical conditions

=== Causes ===
- Medical emergencies can be the consequence of an emergency with another cause, a health problem, or mismanagement of a routine situation or minor contingency.
- Equipment failures that constitute an emergency are usually failures of life-support equipment, but also can be failures of other equipment that make it difficult, dangerous, or impossible to properly operate safety critical equipment, or to reach a place of safety, such as dive computer lockout or failure with decompression obligation, catastrophic dry-suit flooding, catastrophic loss of buoyancy, loss of insulation in very cold conditions, regulator freeze with free-flow, dislodging of the regulator or full-face mask, helmet comes off the head, roll-off of cylinder valve, or a burst breathing gas hose. Some of these can also be caused by diver or team error.
- Diver errors. such as running out of gas, overstaying at depth and developing a decompression obligation beyond the remaining gas endurance, Losing the guideline under an overhead. Equipment failure due to improper preparation and checks. Inappropriate response to an adverse event, such as panic, can cause a routinely recoverable situation to deteriorate into an emergency.
- Team errors. emergencies which are the consequences of a person or group involved in the dive, including contracted service providers. eg: Divers left behind at sea, or run over by the dive boat.
- Third party influences. For example dynamic positioning runout, a diver being hit by a passing boat, or an umbilical pulled into a thruster.
- Environmental problems, situations, effects, or influences such as unforecast weather deterioration, stronger current than anticipated, unexpected low water temperature, silt-out, inadvertent entry into a confined space or overhead environment in low visibility without a guideline to open water, entrapment by nets, lines, wreckage, delta-p situations, collapse of structure, wreckage or overhead, Marine animal injuries, contamination by hazardous materials, surf and currents too strong or mismanaged. Inability to get to exit point due to wind, waves, or currents. Conditions at planned or contingency exit point too rough to exit. Divers carried away from the intended exit area or across a shipping lane by currents.

== Life support emergencies ==
=== Out-of-gas incidents ===
An out-of-gas emergency is a life-support emergency which occurs when the breathing gas supply is cut off by running out, supply system failure, or supply system interruption. These are the most urgent of the common diving emergencies, and the ones the diver should be equipped and skilled to manage. Many out-of-air emergencies are consequences of other problems that were not effectively managed.

A similar emergency occurs when a scuba diver accumulates more decompression obligation than the available gas endurance for decompression. This can happen either by the diver being unable to ascend in time to avoid the problem, or by using up or losing gas supply due to circumstances or inattention. This form of out-of-gas incident develops with the knowledge of the diver, who has more time available to work on a solution if one exists. It is analogous to the problem of being unable to ascent from under an overhead obstruction, and the decompression obligation is sometimes referred to as a decompression overhead.

=== Contaminated scuba gas supply ===
This is usually a consequence of poor filling procedures and often a problem of contaminated intake air. Bailout to another gas source is the preferred option, but it may be necessary to surface on the gas in use. Consequences depend on the specific contaminant and exposure. Carbon monoxide, carbon dioxide, volatile hydrocarbons, and compressor lubricant are the most commonly encountered contaminants, and there may be legislation requiring compressors used in this service to be periodically tested for these contaminants. It is possible though unlikely for mixed breathing gas blended using high pressure industrial grade oxygen that is not certified for breathing grade, to contain contaminants not permitted in a breathing gas.

=== Contaminated surface gas supply ===
It is possible for the surface gas supply to be contaminated, so there will be an alternative surface supply to the gas distribution panel, which can be switched over with minimal delay, and the diver has a bailout gas supply that can be used in such an emergency. The bailout gas carried by the diver may not be sufficient for long decompression, and if this is expected a diving stage or wet bell will be used which carries a larger supply of emergency breathing gas, as well as providing a relatively secure platform for decompression stops.

=== Broken helmet or full-face mask faceplate ===
The transparent faceplates of most helmets in current use are highly impact resistant and not easily damaged to the extent that they leak dangerously. If this does occur, the free-flow valve can be opened to increase internal pressure to reduce leak flow and purge the helmet of water. Tilting the helmet forward to lower the front will bring the faceplate down and may also reduce leakage and will help purge water from the helmet.

=== Hot water supply failure ===
In the event of a suit heating water supply failure that cannot be resolved promptly, the diver will abort the dive. This is a serious problem for divers using helium based breathing gas as heat loss is rapid and the risk of hypothermia is high.

The diver can adjust the flow rate which can help with small deficiencies in the temperature, but if the flow is shut off or the temperature deviates too much the dive must be aborted before the diver is chilled too much.

=== Bell emergencies ===
The bell will be equipped to deal with a bell umbilical failure by switching to onboard emergency gas supply, and the bell will be raised as soon as reasonably possible thereafter. There would be a through-water emergency communications system on a closed bell.

In the event of a dynamic positioning runout, the divers would be recalled to the bell and it would be prepared fo lifting on immediate notice, as a severe runout could snag the bell on an obstacle and it could be lost or stuck.

If the bell lifting winch or cable fails and cannot be restored to function, the bell may be recovered using the clump weight winch (guide wire winch). If this also fails, a wet transfer abandonment may be possible, in which the divers from the damaged bell are transferred to another closed bell through the water.

The bellman would recover an incapacitated diver to the bell. It may be possible to pull the diver back using the umbilical, but it may be necessary for the bellman to lock out to retrieve the diver.

If the bell will not seal at depth, the divers may need to replace the door seal, and check all valves on through-hull penetrations If may be necessary to return the bell to working depth to assess and work on the problem. If a seal cannot be re-established at depth another bell must be sent down to rescue the divers. If the leak starts at the surface, the supervisor would attempt to maintain internal pressure while the bell would be reconnected to the trunking.

A trapped bell may have to be abandoned. In saturation diving the divers would have to be transferred to another bell.

== Entrapment and entanglement emergencies ==
=== Lost guide line ===
A lost guide line under an overhead where the exit cannot be seen is a life-threatening emergency, as the diver will die if they cannot find the way out before they run out of breathing gas. The guideline is usually the only sure way of finding the exit in a cave or wreck penetration, and if not found, the probable consequence is that the diver will not get out before their breathing gas runs out, and they drown. The threat is very real, and the urgency increases with time as gas is consumed. A related emergency is a lost buddy under an overhead. This implies that the buddy has lost the guide line. An aggravated version is when one or more divers enter an overhead knowingly or unknowingly without laying a guide line, and cannot find the way out.

== Decompression emergencies ==
=== Omitted decompression ===
Omitted decompression puts the diver at an increased risk of decompression related to the amount of decompression omitted. There are protocols for managing this type of emergency, depending on severity and whether the diver has developed symptoms. If there is a chamber on site the best approach is to recompress in the chamber, but when there is no chamber, no symptoms, and the diver can be returned to depth in a short time, an in-water procedure for missed stops can be used.

=== Decompression sickness ===
Severe symptomatic decompression sickness can develop during ascent for a variety of reasons, some poorly understood and therefore not entirely reliably avoided.

== Incapacitation ==
=== Loss of consciousness underwater ===
The immediate risk for scuba divers is that the airway may be compromised, with a high risk of drowning. There may also be a high risk of asphyxiation due to hypoxia. A contingent risk is of decompression illness if the diver is surfaced to reduce the more immediate probability of drowning.

- Oxygen toxicity seizure with an unsecured airway.
- Hypoxic loss of consciousness. Hypoxia can be caused to breathing a low oxygen gas mix from the wrong cylinder for the current depth, or a rebreather malfunction. An observant and competent buddy may be able to help, but also risks compounding the emergency by missing significant decompression stops in a rescue attempt. Having a surface support team can increase the chances of a successful outcome.

=== Vertigo and nausea ===
Overwhelming vertigo or nausea underwater can be debilitating. This can be caused by motion sickness, barotrauma of the ears, or inner ear decompression sickness. It is likely to cause vomiting, which can compromise the diver's airway and breathing apparatus. Vomiting through a mouth held demand valve is moderately hazardous, but it can usually be cleared with little effort. A full-face mask is more of a problem, but it can be rinsed and cleared quite easily. Vomiting in a demand helmet is more risky as it is not practicable to rinse to clear, and There is a risk of aspiration of vomit trapped in the helmet air passages, with possibly fatal consequences. This problem is greatest in helmets and full-face masks with internal oro-nasal masks, where it will pass into the demand valve, and that which does not exit through the exhaust ports, will be an aspiration hazard unless flushed out before the next inhalation. A different problem occurs in free-flow helmets - there is less chance of aspiration, but vomit remains in the helmet or drains through into the diving suit, which is unpleasant, but not life-threatening.

=== Hypothermia ===
Hypothermia developing with a long decompression obligation or long return swim to the exit point. This may be a complication of a loss of thermal protection, or an unexpected change in water temperature, or a failure to use appropriate environmental protection. Clinical hypothermia is rare in divers as the diving suit usually slows heat loss even when damaged or inadequate, but there are situations where it can occur, particularly in deep mixed gas diving where the cold, dense, breathing gas can chill the diver internally without the diver being aware of the reduced core temperature.

Hot water supply failure to a hot-water suit used in deep heliox diving can rapidly lead to hypothermia, as can a failure of heating water and electrical power to a diving bell with a heliox atmosphere. Emergency insulation for the divers is required to prevent dangerous hypothermia if the bell cannot be recovered, to keep the divers alive while rescue is arranged.

=== Inert gas narcosis ===
Debilitating inert gas narcosis can occur if the diver goes too deep with a nitrogen-based breathing gas, or can occur if they switch to a nitrogen-based gas too deep, which can happen if there is an out-of-gas emergency without a better option, or the cylinder is incorrectly identified, or some other diver error.

=== Panic ===
Underwater diving is an activity with a high exposure to inherent hazards, which can be conducted at acceptably safe levels when divers participate within the scope of their technical competence, range of experience, physical, and psychological limits.

Raised levels of physical and psychological stress can develop rapidly due to unexpected events and situations. This may lead to panic in a susceptible diver. Diver safety can depend on the diver recognising the onset of stress and panic and making an effective effort to minimise their impact on the emergent situation.

Many divers have reported panic during a dive, and have survived the experience, but panic is associated strongly with a significant proportion of diving fatalities, though it is not always known if the panic was causative to the outcome.

== Acute medical conditions ==
=== General medical emergencies ===
Cardiovascular emergency, major trauma, envenomation etc. In many of these situations it is not practicable to treat the problem in the water, so it is urgent for the diver to surface and get appropriate first aid as soon as possible without causing more serious injury through haste.

=== Severe hypercapnia ===
Severe hypercapnia is more likely to be a problem in rebreather diving. Scrubber failure is the most common cause at moderate to shallow depths. Excessive work of breathing (WoB), when extreme, can exceed the capacity of the diver to eliminate carbon dioxide and eventually cause a hypocapnic blackout, which is likely to be followed by asphyxia or drowning. Several mechanisms may cause high work of breathing WoB, such as high gas density, regulator malfunction, loop flood in a rebreather, or excessive exertion with hypercapnia and the cause must be identified before effective action can be taken, but bailout to open circuit and an immediate termination of the dive is generally an appropriate response where possible. A buddy or standby diver with lower work of breathing may be able to carry out a rescue, depending on the cause of the high WoB.

== Buoyancy emergencies ==
Buoyancy emergencies can be too much buoyancy, causing an uncontrolled ascent, or too little buoyancy, preventing the diver from ascending, or sinking them to excessive depths.

- Loss of diving weights, causing inability to maintain depth. If this happens with a significant decompression obligation, the risk of decompression sickness will be high. The CMAS Self-Rescue Diver training includes the use of a ratchet dive reel to control ascent rate in the event of unplanned positive buoyancy at depth due to loss of weights. The end of the line is fastened to a heavy object on the bottom, and deployed under tension to control depth.
- Dry suit inversion and blowup with significant decompression obligation. An inverted position in a dry suit causes any excess air in the suit to flow towards the feet, which makes the inverted position stable, and makes it difficult to recover horizontal trim. This is exacerbated if the boots pop off the feet, at which point recovery becomes extremely difficult, if not impossible, If the diver is positively buoyant there may be no way to prevent an uncontrolled buoyant ascent, which will usually occur at an excessive rate, and will generally cause the diver to miss all decompression stops
- Catastrophic dry suit flooding with severe loss of buoyancy. This can happen when the diver is at the surface or underwater.
- Inability to establish positive buoyancy at the surface with buoyancy compensator or dry suit inflation can usually be remedied by ditching weights, but many fatal accidents have occurred where the body has been found with all the weights in place, including cases where the diver was at the surface when they first showed signs of being in difficulty.

== Entrapment ==
Entrapment by entanglement, structural collapse, pressure differential, or water flow can prevent the diver from surfacing, and for a scuba diver, may lead to an out-of-gas emergency, or decompression obligation beyond the capacity of the available gas supply. In surface-supplied diving the gas supply is usually secure, the diver is usually in voice contact with the surface, and there is a standby diver available who can follow the diver's umbilical and provide assistance.

== Contamination ==
A diver may be exposed to high risk environmental contaminants, (chemical, biological, radiation etc) for various reasons. The main ones being that the contaminant was not known or suspected to be present, so precautions were not taken, or failure of protective encapsulation by the diving suit and helmet in a known contaminated environment. In this case the diver is likely to be aware of the problem, and the dive team is likely to be prepared for emergency decontamination procedures.

In oilfield work, crude oil leakage may get into the bell and contaminate the bell atmosphere with volatile hydrocarbons or hydrogen sulfide. These are known hazards of the specific environment, and there should be equipment and procedures in place to detect and manage the problem.

== Prevention ==
The primary goal of dive planning, diver training and diving skills and procedures is to prevent and avoid diving emergencies. A significant part of diving equipment is also used for this purpose, and designed to further this goal. In general diving emergencies are prevented by:

- Reliable equipment, fit for purpose, adequately maintained, and checked for correct function before use. Equipment redundancy is used where necessary to keep risk at an acceptable level, and equipment is designed to keep the risk of accidental misuse low.
- Divers are trained and assessed in the relevant skills, and sufficiently practiced so that they remain competent. Codes of practice, operations manuals, and checklists are used to make effective use of lessons learned from previous experience, and to avoid errors in preparation for a dive. Many of the standard diving skills and procedure are specifically intended to prevent common incidents from developing into emergencies.
- Dives are planned, taking known and suspected hazards into account. Divers and dive teams are briefed on the plans, and the plans are followed. In the majority of dives this is sufficient to ensure that dives are completed without serious mishap. As divers gain experience, their ability to see the early stages of what could develop into a problem improve, and their ability to bring the situation back to a safe state is improved.

== Management ==
Despite the risk involved, a diver or diving team should be able to manage a reasonably foreseeable diving emergency. This is accomplished by restricting diving activities to contexts that are reasonably safe given the diver's training and experience, using suitable equipment, and by following procedures developed, tested and otherwise determined to be as effective in those circumstances. When an unforeseen emergency occurs, a diver or diving team must make the best of the situation using the skills, knowledge, intelligence and facilities they have available.

=== Phases ===
Emergency management can be describes as comprising a cycle of four phases: Preparation, response, recovery and mitigation.

Preparation includes drawing up standard operating procedures, ensuring that personnel are appropriately trained and competent, identifying the specific hazards, assessing the risk, planning the specific diving project or dive, drawing up an emergency plan, having appropriate checklists, and a dive briefing. Some of these steps may be iterative where the results of one step are input for another.

=== Skills and procedures ===
Where a hazard cannot be avoided, and the risk is significant, procedures and the relevant skills are developed to manage the problems as they occur, usually at the earliest practicable stage. Where necessary or desirable, equipment which may help manage the foreseen problems may be used, which may require additional skills to operate effectively.

Three levels of skills and procedures are in common use.

- Skills and procedures that are in routine use, which reduce the risk of a problem developing.
- Skills and procedures which are occasionally needed by most divers to manage a relatively rare incident that is foreseeable.
- Skills and procedures that should never be needed, but allow the diver to manage the situation if it does occur, because the consequences are sufficiently serious that competence in the procedures is desirable.

=== Support personnel ===
In most cases the diver has some level of support.

In occupational diving, the diving supervisor is responsible for management of the diving operation, including emergencies. The diver's attendant assists the working diver and supervisor, and the standby diver is specifically employed to be deployed to assist the working diver in an emergency. There may be other team members with specific responsibilities. The dive team is legally required to be competent. The employer or diving contractor is responsible for ensuring competence of all team members, that the equipment is fit for use and the dive plan and emergency plan are appropriate. Dive team members are required to be trained in first aid.

Recreational divers generally only have a dive buddy who may or may not be competent or may even be a further hazard. Buddies are either self-selected, or imposed by a service provider who generally requires the divers to sign a waiver releasing the provider from almost all responsibility. However the service provider is usually required to have some level of emergency plan in place for events which are outside the scope of a buddy diver. An alternative to buddy diving is solo diving, where the diver relies on their own resources and skills in any underwater emergency, and equips themself accordingly.

Technical divers tend to be more extensively trained, more aware of hazards and risk, and make their own arrangements accordingly. They are generally not constrained by legislation, but tend to plan by consensus and are more likely to understand the hazards, risks and consequences of a dive plan. Where appropriate they may organise with voluntary support personnel appropriate to the situation.

=== Emergency plans ===
In general, there should be plans to deal with reasonably foreseeable emergencies that pose a risk to health and safety wherever there is a duty of care, these may include where relevant:

- First Aid for medical emergencies
- Search and recovery
- Casualty evacuation
- Site evacuation
- Hazmat emergencies

Some of the action generally taken to prepare for possible medical emergencies will include:

- Appropriate first aid equipment available on site
- Adequate oxygen administration equipment available on site
- A plan for evacuation of a casualty to a hyperbaric chamber
- A list of contact numbers, call codes and frequencies for local emergency services.
- How to reach the nearest suitable emergency medical facility from the site.

Where a duty of care exists between an employer and employees or a service provider and clients this may include an obligation to plan to deal with reasonably foreseeable emergencies.

The emergency plan, (or emergency action plan), should be specific to the dive plan where applicable, as specific actions should be detailed where possible and depend on the circumstances of the dive plan. As much detail as reasonably practicable can save time during an emergency, when it avoids the need to make detailed plans at the time. The plan should include backup facilities and support for divers remaining in the water.

== Consequences ==
An underwater emergency can have physical and psychological consequences.

A significant proportion of divers experience relatively long term psychological consequences, such as post traumatic stress disorder after a diving accident.

== See also ==
- Buddy diving – Practice of mutual monitoring and assistance between two divers
- Investigation of diving accidents – Forensic investigation of underwater diving accidents
- Diver rescue – Rescue of a distressed or incapacitated diver
- Diving hazards – Agents and situations that pose a threat to the underwater diver
- Diving safety – Risk management of underwater diving activities
- Diving supervisor – Professional diving team leader responsible for safety
- Diving team – Group of people working together to enhance dive safety and achieve a task
- Emergency – Situation requiring urgent intervention
- Emergency response – Appropriate response of emergency services
- Emergency response plan – Action to be taken in specific emergencies
- Public safety diving – Underwater work done by law enforcement, rescue and search and recovery teams
- Rescue diver – Recreational scuba certification emphasising emergency response and diver rescue
- Scuba diving fatalities – Deaths occurring while scuba diving or as a consequence of scuba diving
- Stand-by diver – A member of a dive team who is ready to assist or rescue the working diver
- Underwater search and recovery – Locating and recovering underwater objects
