= Dive planning =

Process of planning an underwater diving operation

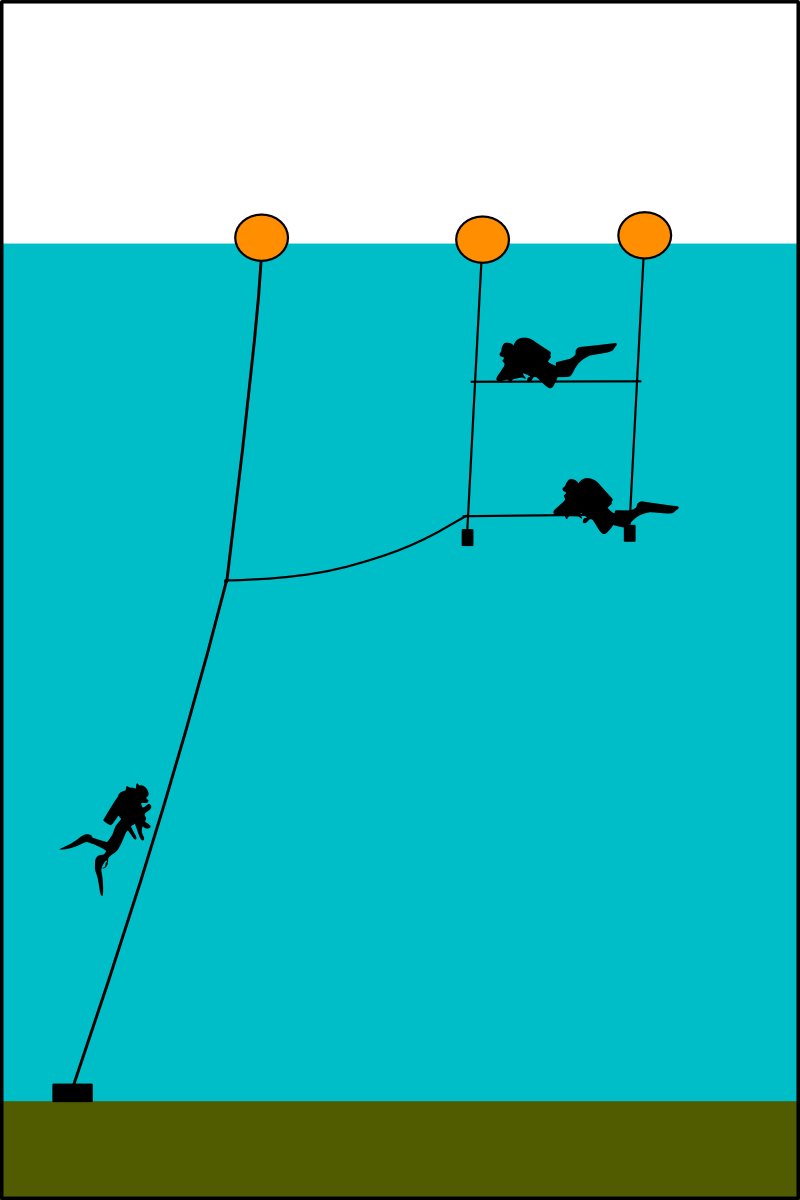
A shotline with decompression trapeze provides a relatively safe and convenient place for in-water decompression.

Dive planning is the process of planning an underwater diving operation. The purpose of dive planning is to increase the probability that a dive will be completed safely and the goals achieved. Some form of planning is done for most underwater dives, but the complexity and detail considered may vary enormously.

Professional diving operations are usually formally planned and the plan documented as a legal record that due diligence has been done for health and safety purposes. Recreational dive planning may be less formal, but for complex technical dives, can be as formal, detailed and extensive as most professional dive plans. A professional diving contractor will be constrained by the code of practice, standing orders or regulatory legislation covering a project or specific operations within a project, and is responsible for ensuring that the scope of work to be done is within the scope of the rules relevant to that work. A recreational (including technical) diver or dive group is generally less constrained, but nevertheless is almost always restricted by some legislation, and often also the rules of the organisations to which the divers are affiliated.

The planning of a diving operation may be simple or complex. In some cases the processes may have to be repeated several times before a satisfactory plan is achieved, and even then the plan may have to be modified on site to suit changed circumstances. The final product of the planning process may be formally documented or, in the case of recreational divers, an agreement on how the dive will be conducted. A diving project may consist of a number of related diving operations.

A documented dive plan may contain elements from the following list:

- Overview of diving activities
- Schedule of diving operations
- Specific dive plan information
- Budget

== Objective ==
Commercial diving contractors will develop specifications for the operation in cooperation with the client, who will normally provide a specific objective. The client will generally specify what work is to be done, and the diving contractor will deal with the logistics of how to do it.

Other professional divers will usually plan their diving operations around an objective related to their primary occupation.

Recreational divers will generally choose an objective for entertainment value, or for training purposes.

It will generally be necessary to specify the following:

- Work to be done, or the recreational equivalent
- Equipment needed
- Procedures to be used
- Personnel required
- Places
- Times

== Analysis of available information on the site ==
- Expected surface conditions, such as sea state, air temperature, and wind chill factor
- Expected underwater conditions, including water temperature, depth, type of bottom, tides and currents, visibility, extent of pollution, and other hazards
- Assistance and emergency information, including location, status, and contact procedures for the nearest recompression chamber, evacuation and rescue facilities, and nearest hospital.
- Location and accessibility of the site

== Selection of techniques and mode of diving ==
Detailed planning depends on the mode and techniques selected for the dive, and the choice of these depends to a large extent on the physical constraints of the dive, but also to the legal, financial and procedural constraints of the divers. The mode and techniques chosen must also allow the dive to be done at an acceptable level of risk. There is usually more than one mode which is physically feasible, and often a choice between modes which are otherwise acceptable. In some cases detailed planning may show that the initial choice was not appropriate, and the process has to be repeated for an alternative choice.

=== Diving without breathing apparatus ===
Freediving does not involve the use of external breathing devices, but relies on a diver's ability to hold his or her breath until resurfacing. Free diving is limited in depth and time, but for some purposes it may be suitable.

=== Scuba diving ===
Diving with a self-contained underwater breathing apparatus, which is completely independent of surface supply, provides the diver with the advantages of mobility and horizontal range far beyond what is possible when supplied from the surface by the umbilical hoses of surface-supplied diving equipment. Scuba has limitations of breathing gas supply, communications between diver and surface are problematic, the location of the diver may be difficult to monitor, and it is considered a higher-risk mode of diving in most circumstances. Scuba is specifically forbidden for some professional applications. Decompression is often avoided, and if necessary, is generally in-water, but may use a variety of gases.

==== Open circuit ====
Open-circuit scuba systems discharge the breathing gas into the environment as it is exhaled, and consist of one or more diving cylinders containing breathing gas at high pressure connected to a primary diving regulator, and may include additional cylinders for decompression gas or emergency breathing gas.

==== Rebreathers ====
Closed-circuit or semi-closed circuit rebreather systems allow recycling of exhaled gases. This reduces the volume of gas used, so that a smaller cylinder, or cylinders, than open-circuit scuba may be used for the equivalent dive duration, and giving the ability to spend far more time underwater compared to open circuit for the same gas consumption. Rebreathers also produce far less bubble volume and less noise than open circuit scuba, which makes them attractive to military, scientific and media divers. They also have a larger number of critical failure modes, are more expensive and require more maintenance and require more training to use at a reasonable level of safety.

=== Surface supplied diving ===
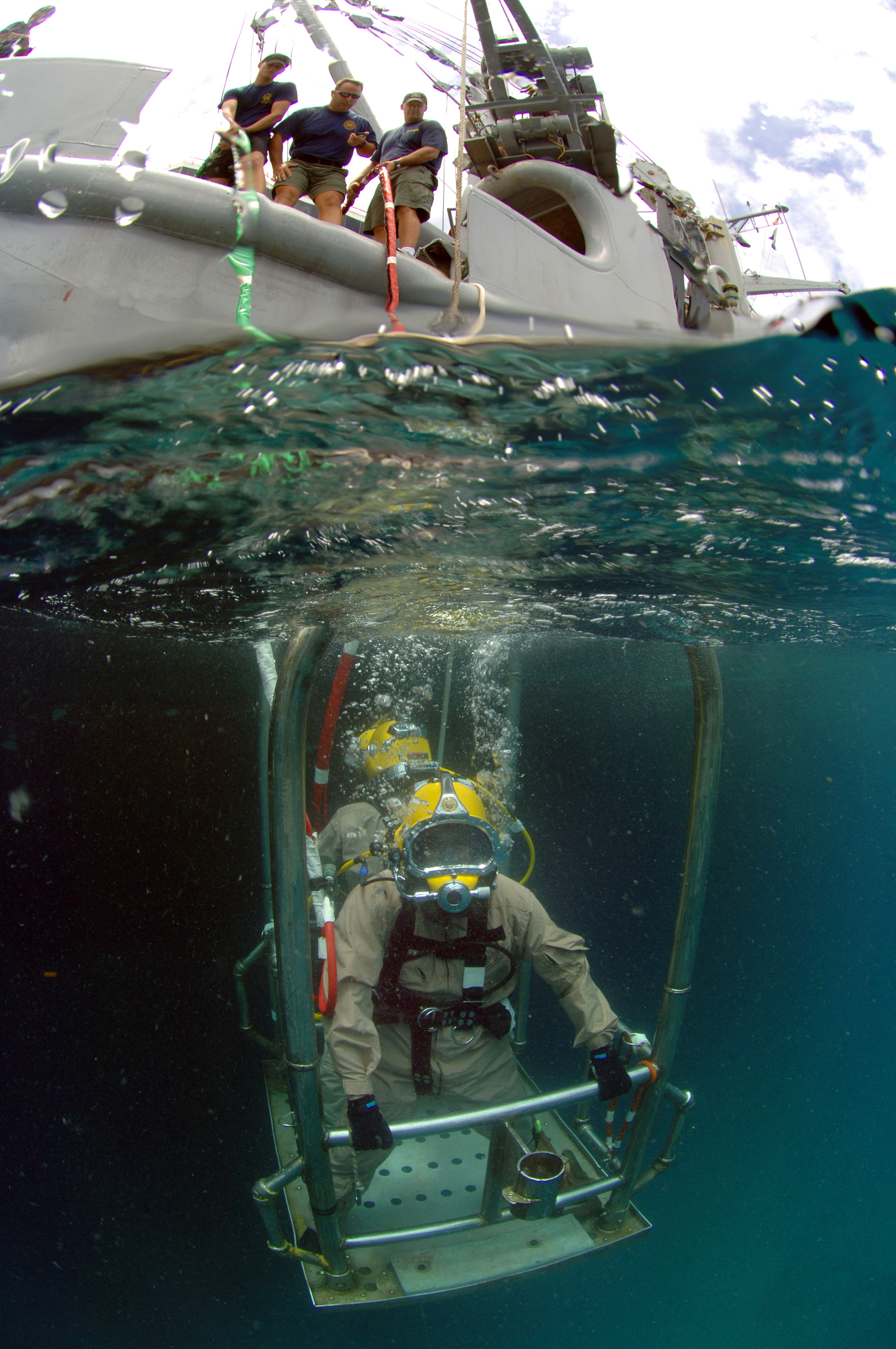
Surface supplied diving using a diving stage

Breathing gases may be supplied from the surface through a diver's umbilical, or airline hose, which provides breathing gas, communications and a safety line, with options for a hot water hose for heating, a video cable and gas reclaim line. The diver's breathing gas supply is significantly more secure than for scuba; communications are simplified and the divers position is either known or can be traced reliably by following the umbilical. Several major risks are thereby mitigated, but the system also has serious disadvantages in some applications, as diver mobility is constrained by the length of the umbilical, and it may snag on obstructions.

Surface-oriented, or bounce diving, is how commercial divers refer to diving operations where the diver starts and finishes the diving operation at atmospheric pressure. The alternative, while retaining surface supply, is saturation diving. For bounce dives, the diver may be deployed directly, often from a diving support vessel or indirectly via a diving bell. Decompression can be by in-water decompression or surface decompression in a deck decompression chamber. Small closed bell systems which include a two-man bell, a launch and recovery frame and a deck chamber for decompression after transfer under pressure (TUP) are reasonably mobile, and suited to deep bounce dives.

=== Saturation diving ===
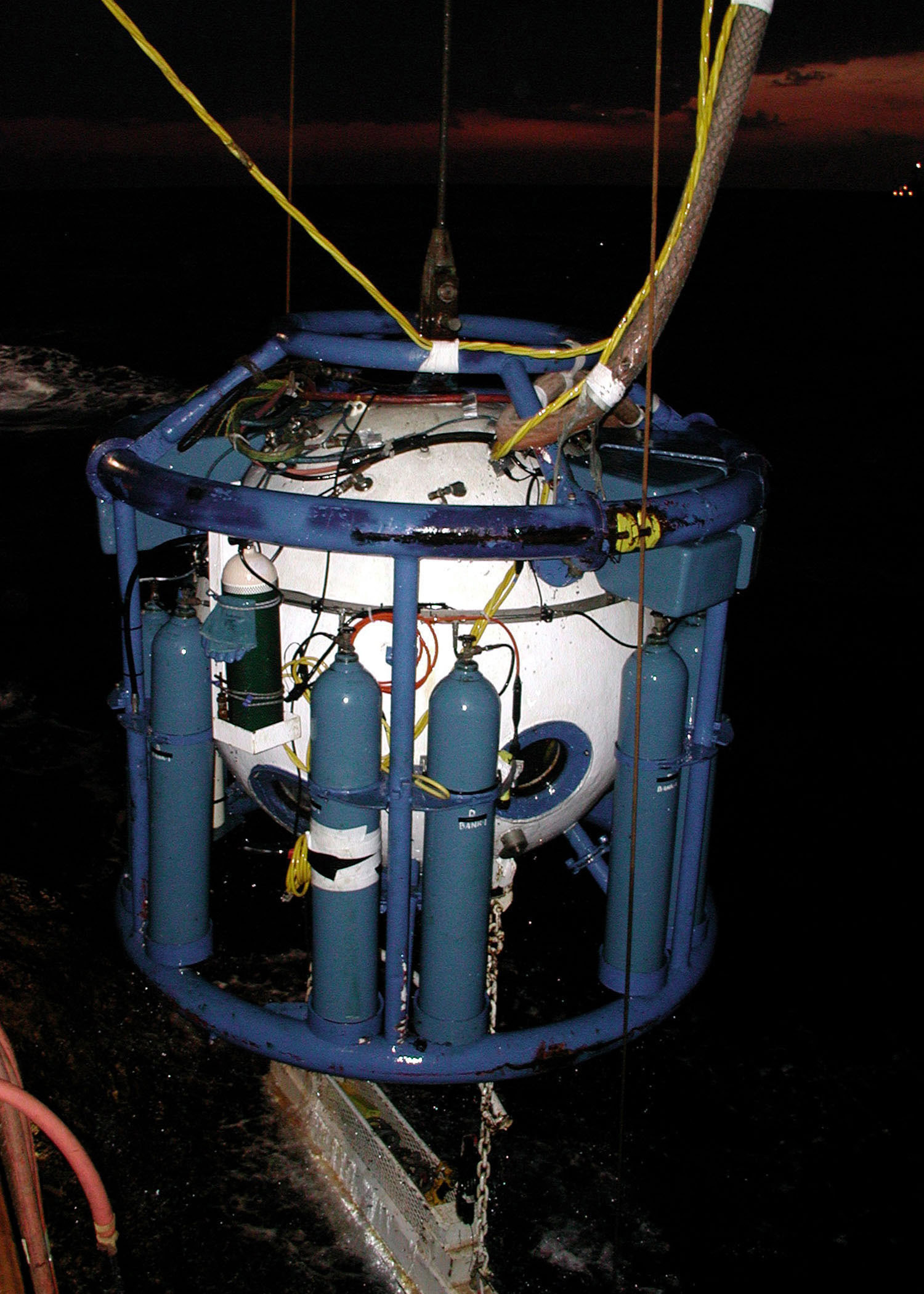
Diver Transfer Capsule suitable for saturation diving

Saturation diving lets divers live and work at depth for days or weeks at a time. After working in the water, divers are transferred in a closed diving bell to rest and live in a dry pressurized underwater habitat on the bottom or a saturation life support system of pressure chambers at the surface. Decompression at the end of the dive may take many days, but since it is done only once for a long period of exposure, rather than after each of many shorter exposures, the overall risk of decompression injury to the diver and the total time spent decompressing are reduced. This type of diving allows greater economy of work and enhanced safety, but the capital and running costs are high and the systems are expensive to transport. Mobility of the diver is restricted because of the umbilical.

=== Atmospheric diving suits ===
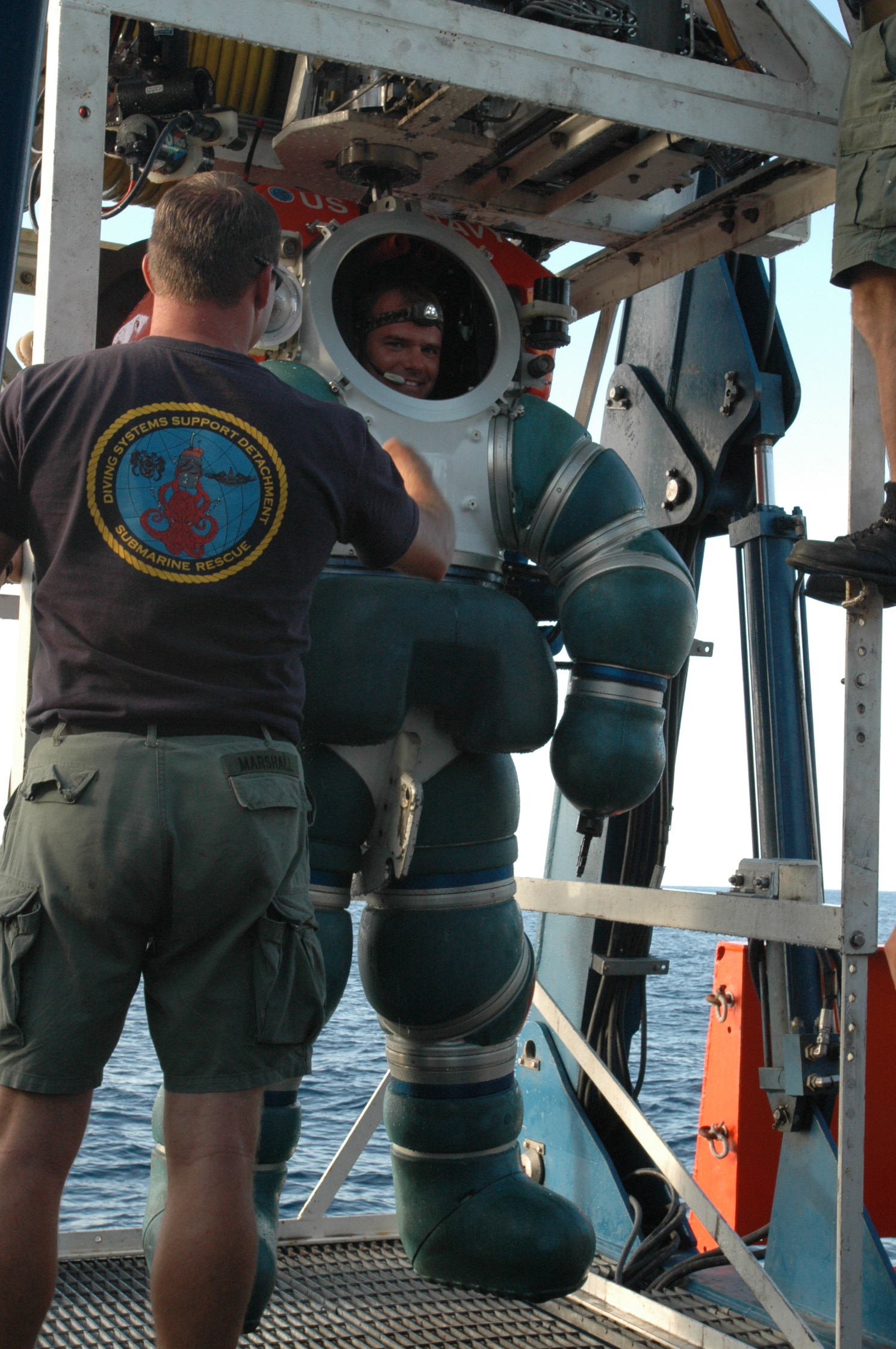
Diver in atmospheric diving suit on launch and recovery platform

Atmospheric diving suits can be used for very deep dives of up to 2,300 feet (700 m) for many hours, and eliminate several physiological dangers associated with deep diving: the occupant need not decompress; there is no need for special gas mixtures; and there is no danger of decompression sickness or nitrogen narcosis. Disadvantages include high cost, limited availability, bulk and limited diver dexterity.

== Diving team selection ==
The diving team personnel selection will depend largely on the diving mode selected and organisational requirements.

Professional dive team members will generally be selected on documented evidence of proven competence or qualification for the tasks allocated. The precise terminology may vary between organisations, but professional diving teams will usually include:

- A diving supervisor
- One or more working divers
- One or more stand-by divers
- One or more diver's attendants
- Other surface support personnel, which may include:
  - Medical support (not necessarily on-site)
  - Chamber operator or life support technician
  - Support vessel crew
  - Equipment technicians, gas panel operators, timekeepers, riggers

Technical teams will also generally base appointments on proven competence, certification or personal trust. Technical diving groups vary in complexity, but will generally comprise:

- Dive team
- In-water support team
- Surface support team

Recreational groupings may be based on personal experience and trust, but are frequently relatively arbitrary allocations by the service provider, based on certification. Recreational diving groups commonly comprise a buddy pair of divers, but may also be a solo diver or a group of divers who will be led by a divemaster. Selection may be by mutual agreement to dive together, or may simply be the result of booking on the same dive.

== Depth and time ==
Depth is often one of the more straightforward parameters, as it is often fixed by the topography of the site. Time is influenced by limitations of equipment and decompression constraints, as well as the actual time required to perform the intended task, which in turn is influenced by the underwater environment in general, and specific to the site. Together, the depth and time constitute the planned dive profile, which is needed for decompression planning and gas planning.

== Environmental factors ==
The specific diving environment at the dive site will determine several factors which may require specific planning. The depth, water salinity and altitude affect decompression planning. An overhead environment affects navigation and gas planning. Water temperature and contaminants affect the choice of exposure and environmental protection. Site topography affects the choice of entry and exit points, and entry and exit procedures, which may require special equipment. The presence of entrapment or entanglement hazards, or dangerous animals, may require special precautions and additional equipment.

== Hazards of the proposed diving operation ==
Divers face specific physical and health risks when they go underwater with diving equipment, or use high pressure breathing gas.

A hazard is any biological, chemical, physical, mechanical or environmental agent or situation that poses a level of threat to life, health, property, or environment. The presence of a combination of several hazards simultaneously is common in diving, and the effect is generally increased risk to the diver, particularly where the occurrence of an incident due to one hazard triggers other hazards with a resulting cascade of incidents.

Diving hazards may be classified under several groups:

- The aquatic environment itself
- Use of breathing equipment underwater
- Exposure to a pressurised environment and pressure changes
  - Pressure changes during descent
  - Pressure changes during ascent
  - Breathing gases at high ambient pressure
- The specific diving environment
- Pre-existing physiological and psychological conditions in the diver
- Diver behaviour and competence
- Failure of diving equipment other than breathing apparatus
- Hazards of the dive task and special equipment

=== Risk assessment ===
The assessed risk of a dive would generally be considered unacceptable if the diver is not expected to be able to cope with any single reasonably foreseeable incident with a significant probability of occurrence during that dive, or the dive team is not expected to be able to manage the probable consequences of such an event. Professional diving organisations tend to be less tolerant of risk than recreational, particularly technical divers, who are usually not constrained by occupational health and safety legislation.

Risk assessment is mandated in professional diving, where it is the specific responsibility of the diving supervisor, and is expected in recreational diving, where it is generally the responsibility of the individual diver, though the expectations of the level of risk assessment are highly variable, and are associated with the level of training, certification and experience of the dive team, and the circumstances of the dive. A diving instructor is responsible for risk assessment during training, and a professional dive leader is responsible for some aspects of risk assessment when leading clients at an unfamiliar site.

== Dive profile ==
The planned dive profile is an important input parameter for gas planning and decompression planning, and is generally based on the time required to perform the task of each specific dive, and the depth at which the task will be performed, in combination with environmental considerations and the breathing gas mixtures chosen. Limits are often due to exposure to cold, work load, decompression time, safety constraints and logistics of breathing gas supply.

== Route ==
For some dives the route to be followed and navigation procedures to follow the planned route may be important, either for achieving the objective, for safety, or for both. There may be known hazards that can be avoided by following a specific route or constraining the possible extent of diver excursion.

In all penetration dives the route may be critical for safety. The diver must be assured of getting out from the overhead zone before running out of gas. The standard method is to follow a guideline into and out of the overhead environment, and laying the line or laying and recovering the line may be part of the dive plan. In explorations and surveys the route may be unknown or uncertain, and contingency plans must be known to the divers so that the dive plan can be altered to suit the situation as it unfolds.

Professional divers may follow a planned route to the worksite which prevents the diver from close approach to known hazards. This may involve limiting umbilical length and manned or unmanned underwater tending points, downlines and jackstays.

== Choice of equipment ==
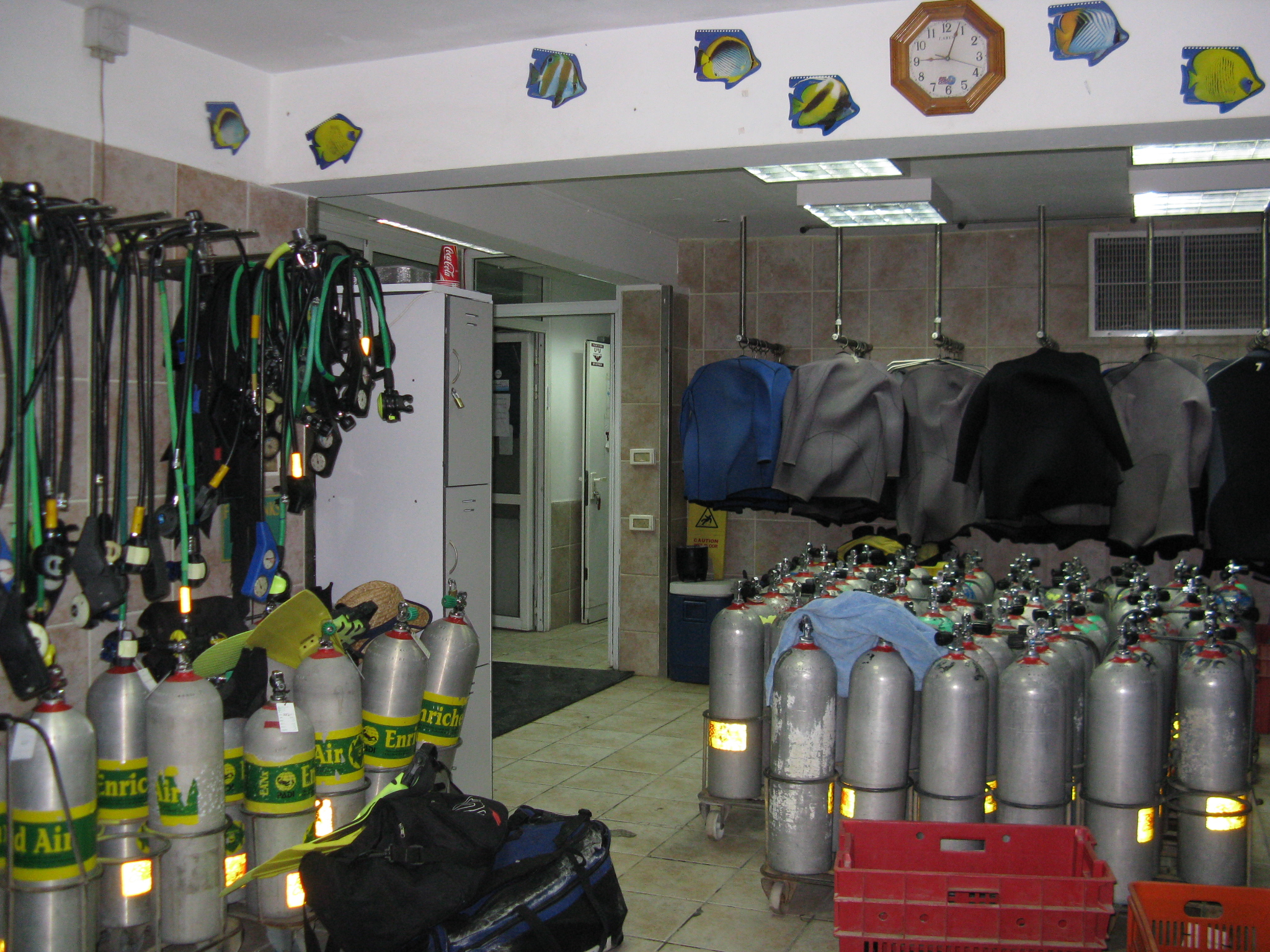
Diving equipment in storage

Equipment will be chosen based on several constraints, including:

- Legal and procedural requirements of the organisation
- Availability of equipment
- Diver skills and certification
- Suitability for the purpose
- Risk and benefit considerations

Equipment and supplies selection would normally include:

- Diving equipment
- Breathing gas, including a backup supply
- Tools or equipment for the task if appropriate
- Dive platform and support equipment, including diver/crew shelter
- Oxygen resuscitator and first aid kit
- Dive flag
- Communications equipment

A recreational diver may expect many of these items to be arranged by the service provider (the dive boat operator, shop, or school providing the transport to the dive site and organising the dive). Technical diving is less constrained by legislation than professional diving, but risk analysis may indicate similar equipment to be necessary or desirable for a specific dive.

== Decompression planning ==
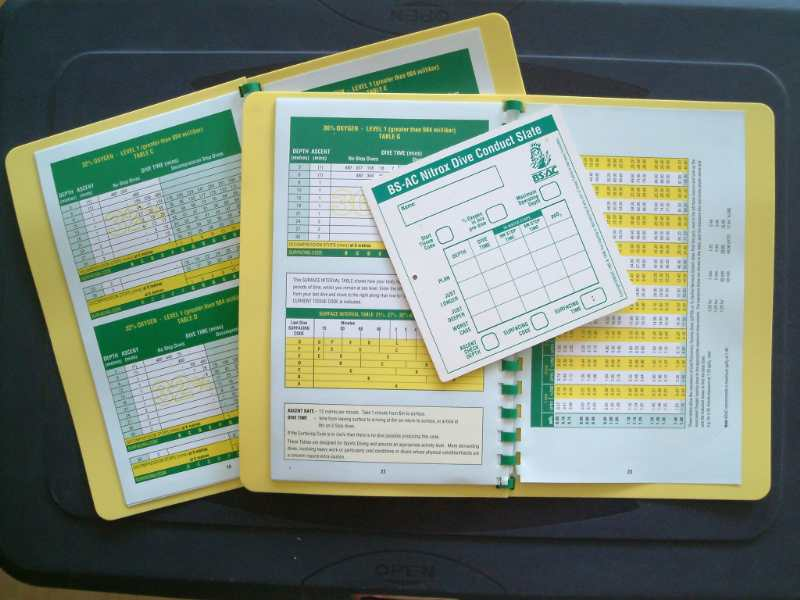
Decompression tables for recreational dive planning

Decompression is planned based on the intended dive profile, the chosen gas mixtures, and the chosen decompression tables or algorithms.

There are two basic approaches to decompression for surface oriented dives, and one for saturation diving.

- Real time computation of tissue gas levels and the appropriate decompression schedule may be monitored by personal decompression computers worn by the diver. This system is popular with recreational, technical and scientific scuba divers. Any deviation from the planned profile is automatically taken into account, and the diver can keep track at all times of the current total time required for ascent. The surface team is not aware of the decompression status of a diver unless there is voice communication and the diver reports the information.
- Decompression schedules are drawn up for the planned dive profile before the dive from tables or a program. Contingency schedules are usually prepared for scuba divers, which allow for all the reasonably probable deviations from the planned schedule, and usually allow for variations in depth and time. These schedules are carried by the diver and used to manage the ascent profile and decompression. Surface supplied divers are monitored by the surface team, and if they deviate from plan the supervisor can change the schedule to suit.
- Saturation diving will decompress the divers only at the end of the diving contract, in the controlled and relatively comfortable environment of the saturation system. The schedule will depend on the pressure and breathing gas mixture, not on the duration of exposure.

The procedures chosen will to a large extent depend on the mode of diving and equipment available.

== Gas planning ==
Gas planning for diving operations where divers use open circuit equipment with breathing gas mixtures is more complex than operations where atmospheric air is supplied via low pressure compressor from the surface, or the breathing gas is reclaimed, processed and re-used.

=== Scuba gas planning ===
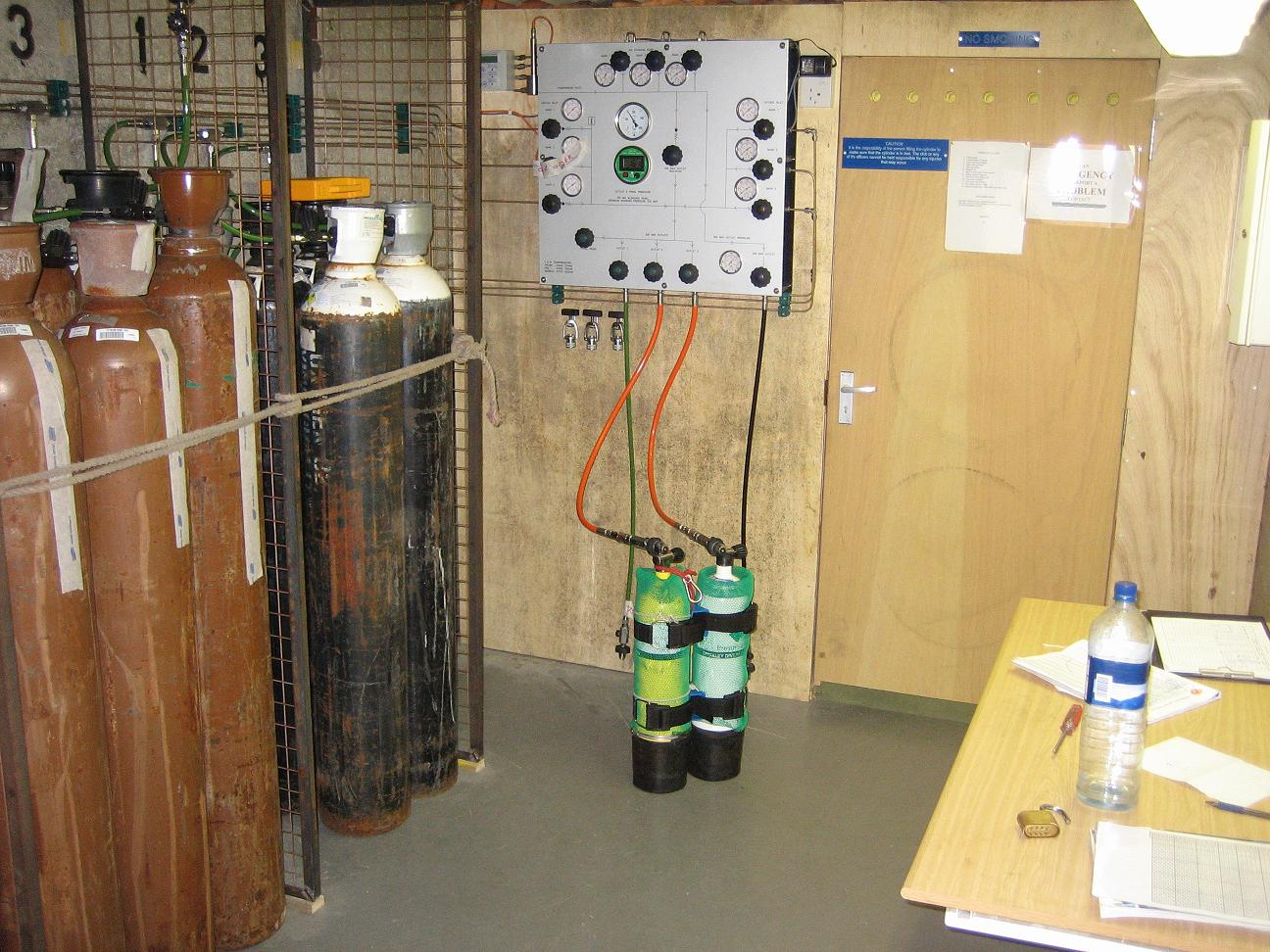
Gas blending equipment

Scuba gas planning is the aspect of dive planning which deals with the calculation or estimation of the amounts and mixtures of gases to be used for a planned dive profile, and can be critical to the safety of the dive. The scuba diver by definition is independent of surface supply and, in general, must carry all gas needed for the dive, though in limited circumstances depots of drop cylinders may be placed along the route of the dive for use on the return. This requires the route to be marked and the divers to return along the marked route, and is particularly suited to penetration dives, such as wreck and cave dives.

Deep dives with open water ascents can also occasionally make use of surface standby divers who can provide contingency gas to ascending divers whose position is marked by a shotline or decompression buoys.

The calculations assume that the dive profile, including decompression, is known, but the process may be iterative, involving changes to the dive profile as a consequence of the gas requirement calculation, or changes to the gas mixtures chosen.

Scuba gas planning includes the following aspects:

- Choice of breathing gases
  - to limit decompression requirements
  - to limit inert gas narcosis
  - to limit work of breathing
- Choice of Scuba configuration
- Estimation of gas quantities required for the planned dive, including bottom gas, travel gas, and decompression gases, as appropriate to the profile.
- Estimation of gas quantities for reasonably foreseeable contingencies.
- Choice of cylinders to carry the required gases. Each cylinder volume and working pressure must be sufficient to contain the required quantity of gas.
- Calculation of the pressures for each of the gases in each of the cylinders to provide the required quantities.
- Specifying the critical pressures of relevant gas mixtures for appropriate stages (waypoints) of the planned dive profile.

=== Surface supplied gas planning ===
Open circuit surface supplied diving mostly uses air as the breathing gas, though mixed gases may also be used.

Surface supplied air is generally supplied by low pressure compressor, and the continuous supply is limited only by the compressor continuing to run effectively, and to provide air of suitable quality. There is also a reserve air supply, either from a second compressor, or from fairly large high pressure cylinders. Each diver also carries a scuba bailout cylinder, which should carry sufficient gas to safely surface from any point in the planned dive.

Running out of air is a relatively low risk with these facilities, and gas planning centres on ensuring that the primary and, if present, backup compressors are correctly sized to provide the necessary pressure and flow rates. These are specified by the breathing equipment manufacturer based on depth and workload, and by the compressor manufacturer for the standard running speed of the machine.

Reserve surface supply cylinder contents are based on the gas requirement for safe ascent from any part of the dive, allowing for reasonably foreseeable delays, and for a rescue by the standby diver.

The diver's bailout cylinder should contain adequate gas in case of an emergency at the planned depth. Critical pressure should be calculated based on the planned profile and must allow change-over, ascent and all planned decompression.

In some jurisdictions the stand-by diver must be supplied from an air source which is independent of that supplying the working divers, as the cause of an emergency may be failure or contamination of the main air supply to the working diver.

==== Low pressure compressor delivery ====
Compressors are rated according to the volume of air taken in each minute. This is also the free gas volume that will be supplied to the divers. The volume of air used by the divers will depend on work rate and depth. Short term variations are compensated by the air receiver on the compressor. The delivery volume at maximum ambient pressure for the planned dive must be sufficient for all the divers to be supplied from the compressor.

The supply pressure must be in excess of minimum functional pressure for the regulator to be enough to get air to the diver. In practice a delivery pressure of about 20 bar is commonly used. The manufacturer of the helmet or full-face mask will specify a pressure range which will deliver sufficient air for a given dive depth, which is usually from 6 to 10 bar more than the ambient pressure due to depth.

==== Free flow helmets ====
Free flow helmets generally require a considerably higher compressor delivery than demand helmets, as the flow is continuous, and should never drop below peak inhalation rate of the diver. Flow rates up to 1500 litres per minute surface equivalent are quoted for the Divex AH-5 helmet at 50 metres sea water for heavy work. Delivery pressure at the AH-5 helmet is recommended at 3.5 bar above ambient.

=== Saturation gas planning ===
Saturation systems frequently use gas reclaim equipment to minimize the loss of expensive helium, and this makes the gas usage relatively independent of dive duration and depth, however reserves must be available in case of loss or leakage.

Scrubber systems are used to remove carbon dioxide from the breathing gas, and other filters to remove odours and other contaminants. Booster pump systems are used to return gas to high pressure storage.

== Contingency plans ==
Contingency planning covers what to do if something happens that is not according to the planned operation. The hazard identification and risk assessment will suggest the range of foreseeable contingencies, and the specifics of how much to organise to deal with them will depend on the consequences.

In general, contingencies that have serious health and safety consequences should have plans in place to deal with them, while those which are merely an inconvenience may be accepted if they occur.

Some contingency classes are listed here:

- Environmental condition changes
  - Weather and sea state
- Equipment malfunctions
- Incorrect information
  - Position of site
  - Accessibility
  - Environmental conditions
  - Unexpected hazards
  - Extent of work, equipment required

One contingency that must always be considered is an out-of-gas emergency, as there are several ways it can happen, it is known to have happened by most of these ways on more than one occasion, and the consequences can be fatal. The diver must be able to safely reach a reliable alternative source of breathing gas at all times during the planned dive. Plans for technical contingencies may include arrangements for alternative equipment, spares, alternative boat etc. The level of contingency planning will depend on the project, and the importance of the task. Plans for adverse conditions may include arrangements for alternative dates, or in some cases alternative venues.

== Emergency plans ==
In general, there should be plans to deal with reasonably foreseeable emergencies that pose a risk to health and safety wherever there is a duty of care, these may include where relevant:

- First Aid for medical emergencies
- Search and recovery
- Casualty evacuation
- Site evacuation
- Hazmat emergencies

Some of the action generally taken to prepare for possible medical emergencies will include:

- Appropriate first aid equipment available on site
- Adequate oxygen administration equipment available on site
- A plan for evacuation of a casualty to a hyperbaric chamber
- A list of contact numbers, call codes and frequencies for local emergency services.
- How to reach the nearest suitable emergency medical facility from the site.

== Permits and permission ==
It may be necessary to arrange for clearance to dive. Permits or permission for access or to dive at the site may be required, and making the arrangements can be considered part of dive planning.

This may include, but is not limited to:

- Permits to dive in a marine protected area
- Permits to collect specimens at a specific site or in general.
- Permits to use specific collecting methods.
- Permits to operate specific equipment.
- Permits to dive on an archaeological site.
- Permits to perform salvage work.
- Permits to perform drilling and blasting work.
- Permits or permission to launch or recover a vessel at a specific place.
- Permits to operate a vessel in restricted areas.
- Permission from harbourmaster to dive within harbour limits.
- Permission from port control to dive in shipping lanes.
- Permission from landowners to access the water, and to dive in inland waters.
- Permission from utilities companies to dive in reservoirs.
- Clearance from vessel operators or installation operators that the site is safe to dive.
- Clearance that contamination is acceptable for the diving equipment to be used. This may require a water sample to be tested before the dive.

== Schedule of operational tasks ==
Scheduled activities generally include:

- Travel to the site
- Preparation of diving and support equipment
- Predive briefing
- Planned diving operations
- Recovery, cleaning, inspection, repair, and storage of gear
- Debriefing

== Budget ==
Estimating the cost of a diving operation is an important component of the planning process, and is dependent on almost all the factors described above.

== Dive planning software ==
Dive planning for technical diving can be relatively complex, particularly the aspects of decompression and gas planning, which are the components of dive planning most amenable to automation. Software for decompression planning on personal dive computers, smartphones and other personal computers has become easily available and reliable, and has made manual calculations largely obsolescent, though they are still common during training, so that the diver can develop a feel for the correct order of magnitude of the computed values, as a sanity check in case of input errors.

The original system of technical dive planning involved either looking up the commercial or military tables for a depth and time profile, or contacting a researcher for experimental tables if they wanted to use trimix. Later, pregenerated trimix tables became available within the community. The schedule of depths and run times for the planned profile would be written on a dive slate, along with contingency schedules for extended exposure, usually for deeper depth, longer bottom time and/or both. A bailout schedule could also be carried, for a shorter bottom time and/or shallower depth. CNS and OTU exposure values would be manually calculated for these schedules, and gas requirements calculated for each phase of the profiles, including contingency gas, using the rule of thirds, rock bottom calculations, or other rule of thumb, and used to select appropriate cylinders. Contingency plans for loss of decompression gas would usually also be carried. The dive would be done following the dive plan and monitored using a watch and depth gauge or a bottom timer.

Later, dive computers that were programmed with algorithms for mixed gas diving and constant oxygen partial pressure for rebreather diving became available. These were built to be used to greater depths, but they were expensive and sometimes unreliable, so some diver and training agencies did not trust them and insisted on using a written plan and schedule, using a computer as a backup in case of an emergency, which was a waste of the flexibility provided by real-time monitoring of decompression status by the computer, similar to the situation when dive computers were first accepted for scientific diving.

As technical diving computers became more reliable and more affordable, more divers started accepting them as the primary tool for dive and decompression monitoring, using the written schedule as a backup, but still planning the dive beforehand based on a specified maximum depth and bottom time, so that gas planning based on the planned profile would be reliable. When the diver has a backup computer, the flexibility of the real-time monitoring can be fully utilised.

=== Real time computer aided contingency management ===
A consequence of using a decompression computer to monitor gas loading during a dive is that it becomes possible to adapt the dive plan during the dive, but it remains necessary to ensure that there is sufficient gas remaining to make the return to the surface with all necessary decompression while providing emergency gas for a buddy. Tools for adapting the dive plan for contingencies during a dive are available on some technical diving computers. The primary change in dive planning was that the ascent profile became controlled by the computer for the actual decompression obligation of the dive up to and including the parts of the ascent already done.

Dive computers have become more reliable and more affordable, so it is fairly common for tech divers to have a backup computer. This reduces the risk of a computer failure during the dive necessitating an ascent controlled by depth gauge, timer and dive tables, and all the extra functionality and flexibility remains available to the diver. One of the options available is to set up the backup computer with different display settings and user options, but when these can be selected at any time during the dive, there is no great advantage provided the diver is sufficiently familiar with the device.

Gas usage calculations are relatively straightforward for a fixed decompression schedule. It becomes more complicated when the surfacing schedule may vary. Since the primary purpose of gas planning is to ensure that there is sufficient breathing gas for a safe return to the surface for all members of the team, this minimum gas principle (also known as critical pressure of ascent) can be used to check any changes in the plan made during the dive. Minimum gas is linked to a planned "time to surface" (TTS) and maximum depth from which the ascent may be started. During the dive it is necessary to ensure that the TTS displayed on the dive computer does not exceed the planned maximum TTS associated with the "minimum gas" available.

The current "no-decompression limit" is a function normally displayed on the main screen until it runs out. Once the diver has a decompression obligation, other functions may become available, such as time to surface, decompression ceiling, depth of the next decompression stop, predicted value for TTS change for staying an extra period at the current depth (such as 5 minutes). By comparing the ceiling depth and the stop depth, the diver can get an indication of the depth tolerance at the stop. This will increase during the stop, and when it reaches the depth of the next stop, the stop is complete.

Another display that might be available is the current gradient factor or M-value. On the Shearwater computers this is indicated by GF99 value displayed, which shows the diver how close their leading tissue is to gradient factor for the current depth for the user selected GF high and GF low values. If the diver ascends above the indicated decompression stop depth, the computer will display a warning. This depth may still be below the ceiling displayed, and the GF99 will indicate the reduction in conservatism in play.

There may be a graphic display such as a bar graph indicating tissue loading and the oxygen window for one or more representative tissues, which can give the diver a feel for how the outgassing is progressing. A display for surfacing gradient factor may be available. This shows the GF that would occur if the diver were to surface directly at that time, without any stops. A surfacing GF of less than 100% indicates that the diver can or has surfaced with some conservatism relative to the baseline unmodified algorithm. A surfacing GF of over 100% indicates a relatively high risk. This feature can be useful it there is an urgent need to surface as early as possible and a slightly increased decompression risk is acceptable.
