= Dive profile =

Diver's pressure exposure over the time of a dive

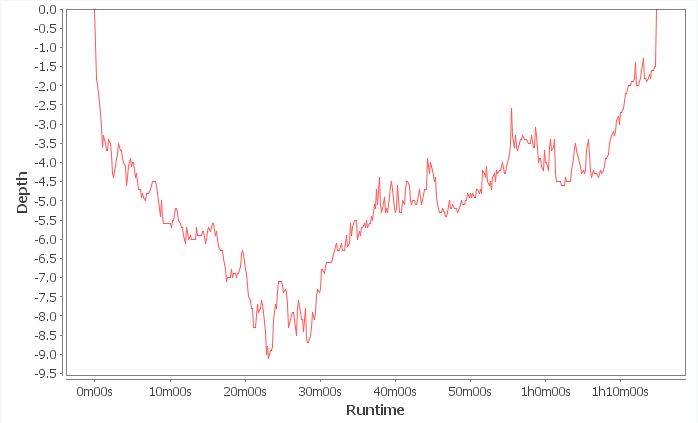
Dive profile of an actual dive as recorded by a personal dive computer and displayed on a desktop screen using dive logging software. In this case depth is in metres.

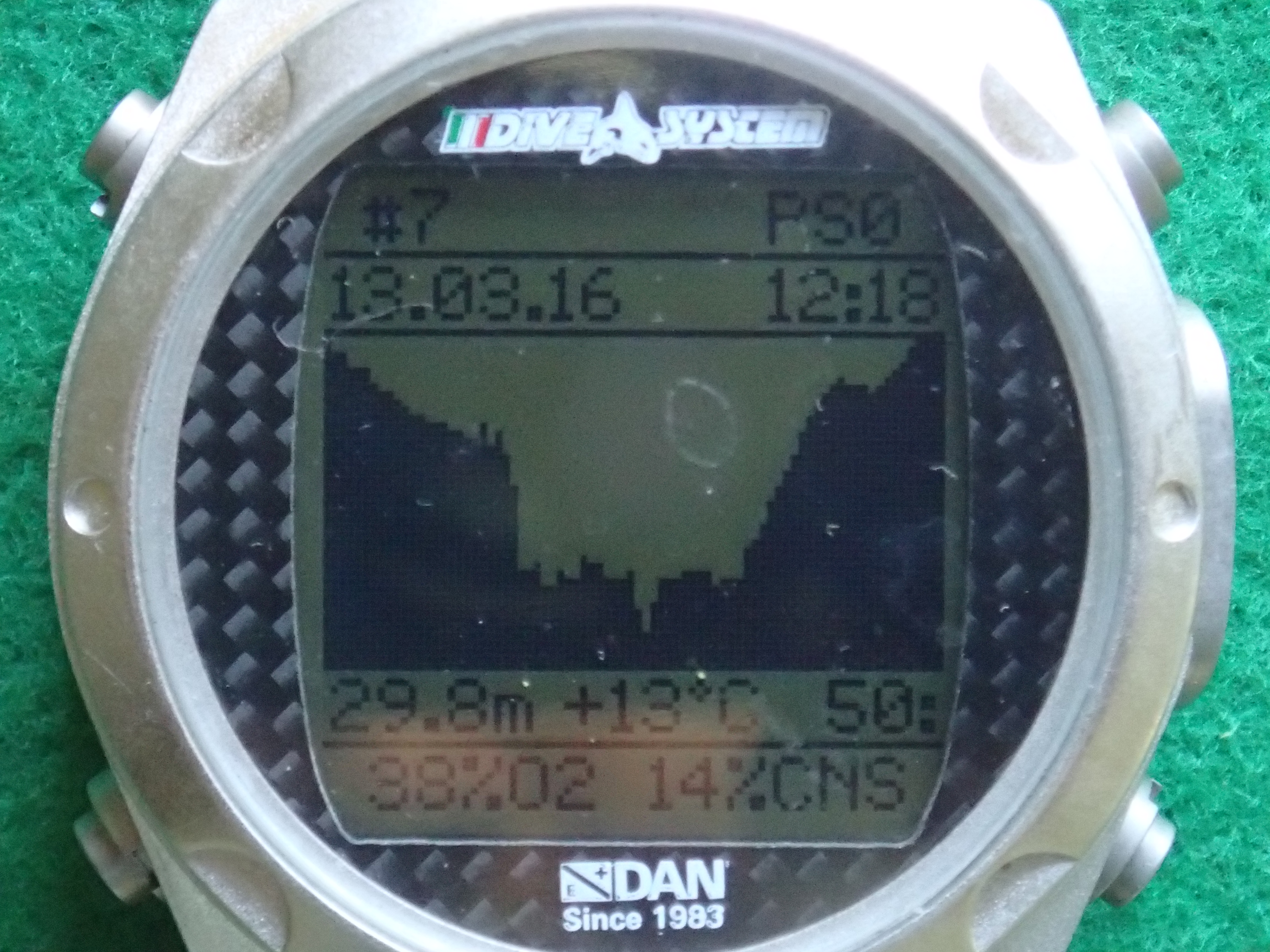
Personal dive computer display of dive profile and log data

A dive profile is a description of a diver's pressure exposure over time. It may be as simple as just a depth and time pair, as in: "sixty for twenty," (a bottom time of 20 minutes at a depth of 60 feet) or as complex as a second by second graphical representation of depth and time recorded by a personal dive computer. Several common types of dive profile are specifically named, and these may be characteristic of the purpose of the dive. For example, a working dive at a limited location will often follow a constant depth (square) profile, and a recreational dive is likely to follow a multilevel profile, as the divers start deep and work their way up a reef to get the most out of the available breathing gas. The names are usually descriptive of the graphic appearance.

The intended dive profile is useful as a planning tool as an indication of the risks of decompression sickness and oxygen toxicity for the exposure, to calculate a decompression schedule for the dive, and also for estimating the volume of open-circuit breathing gas needed for a planned dive, as these depend in part upon the depth and duration of the dive. A dive profile diagram is conventionally drawn with elapsed time running from left to right and depth increasing down the page.

Many personal dive computers record the instantaneous depth at small time increments during the dive. This data can sometimes be displayed directly on the dive computer or more often downloaded to a personal computer, tablet, or smartphone and displayed in graphic form as a dive profile.

== Concept ==
The profile of a dive is the variation of depth, measured as ambient pressure, over time during that dive. The actual location of the diver at any time is generally not considered, as the dive profile is a tool for dive planning and decompression status calculation. Other data may be added to the depth graph, such as partial pressures of the breathing gas constituents, calculated estimates of accumulated gas concentrations in the theoretical tissue, gas consumption rates and cumulative gas consumption. These additional values are available when the dive computer uses them to estimate decompression status, to provide the diver with a recommend decompression schedule for the exposure of the actual dive.

== Types of dive profile ==
Some types of dive profile have been named. An analysis of dive profiles logged by dive computers by the Divers Alert Network used categorization rules which were based on the fraction of the dive time spent in four depth zones: descent, bottom, multilevel, and decompression. The descent zone was defined as the part of the dive between the surface and first reaching 85% of the maximum depth. The bottom zone is the part of the dive deeper than 85% of maximum depth. The multilevel zone is ascent from 85% to 25% of maximum depth, and the decompression zone is less than 25% of maximum depth. A square dive profile was defined as having more than 40% of the total dive time in the bottom zone and not more than 30% in the multilevel and decompression zones. A multilevel was defined as having at least 40% of the total dive time in the multilevel zone. All other dives are considered to be intermediate.

=== Recorded actual dive profile ===
A dive computer will usually record the actual dive profile in real time, in a format that can be downloaded and viewed later. Depth (pressure) values are recorded at intervals which are usually 30 seconds or less, along with other measured data at that time.

If the pressure is measured manually by pneumofathometer by the diving supervisor it will also be recorded manually when it changes. The detailed profile does not generally need to be logged as the maximum depth is used with tables unless a multilevel dive profile is required, in which case the time will be logged for each change of depth, and for the start and end of each decompression stop.

=== Square profile ===
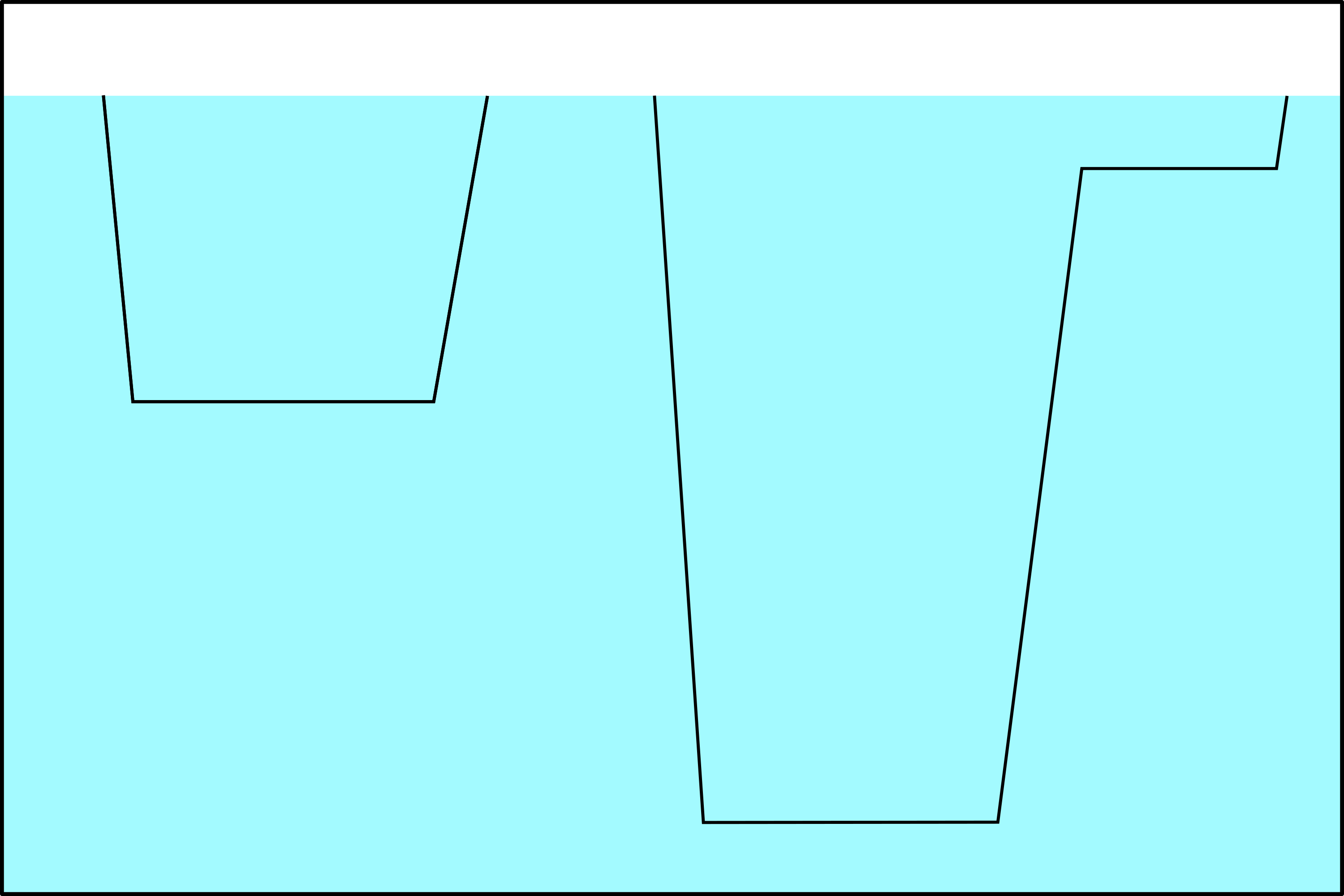
Square profiles without and with decompression stop

Or constant (bottom) depth profile. The diver descends directly to maximum depth, spends most of the dive at maximum depth and then ascends directly at a safe rate, with any required decompression. The sides of the "square" are not truly vertical due to the need for a slow descent to avoid barotrauma and a slow ascent rate to avoid decompression sickness. The term has also been used more loosely, for example DAN's definition of more than 40% of total dive time in the bottom zone which is within 15% of maximum depth.

This type of profile is common for dives at sites where there is a flat sea-bed or where the diver remains at the same place throughout the dive to work. It is the most demanding profile for decompression for a given maximum depth and time because inert gas absorption continues at maximum rate for most of the dive. Decompression tables are drawn up based on the assumption that the diver may follow a square profile and be working while at the bottom, which is common practice for professional divers.

=== Multi-level diving ===
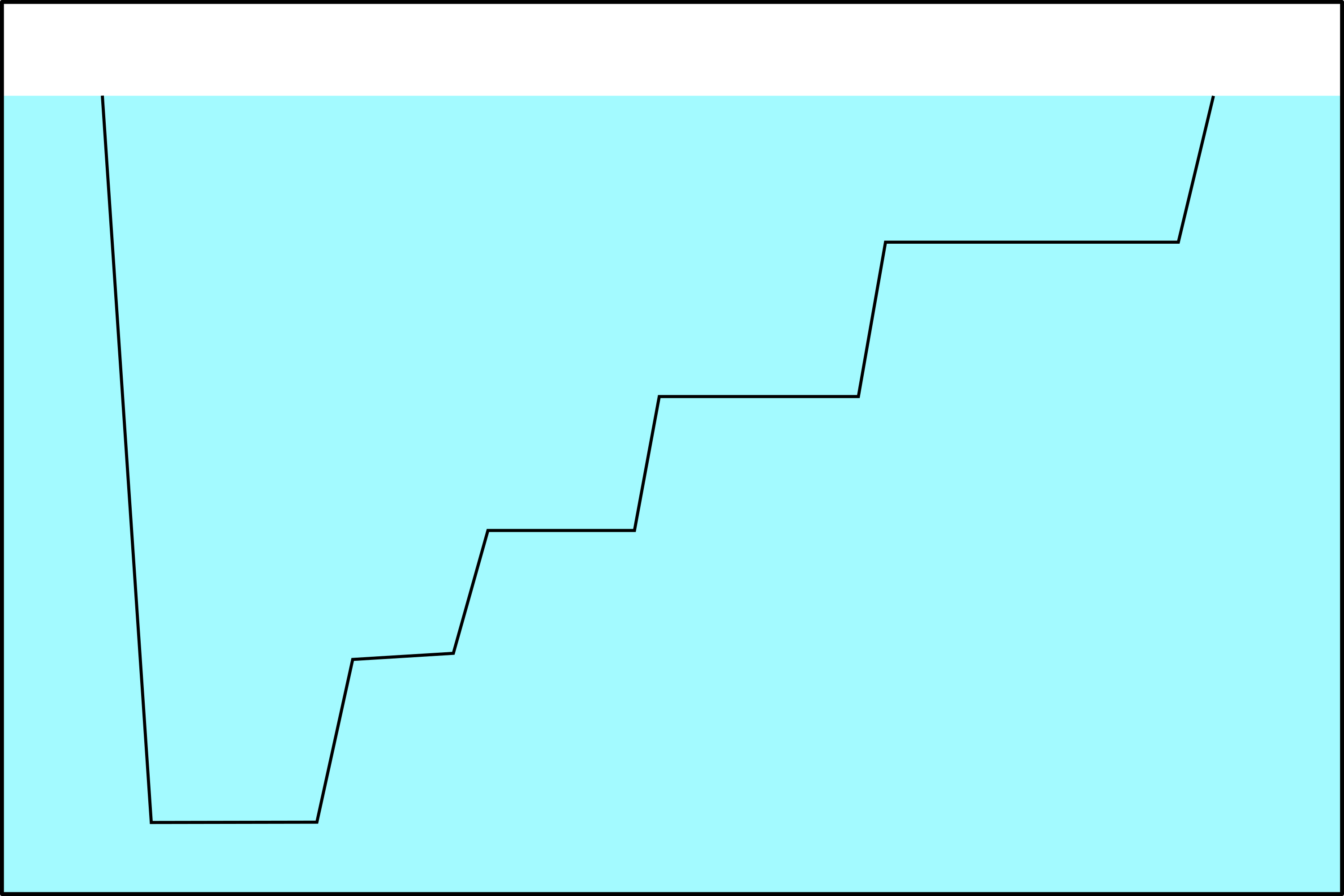
Multilevel dive profile without decompression stop

Multi-level diving, in the broader sense, is diving where the activity other than descent, direct ascent, and decompression, takes place in more than one depth range, where a depth range can be arbitrarily defined for convenience, and usually follows the depth graduations of the decompression tables in use. Most recreational diving is multi-level by this description. In the narrower sense, it implies that decompression is calculated based on the time spent in each of more than one depth range. Decompression calculations using dive tables for multi-level dives were moderately common practice for advanced recreational diving before dive computers were widely used.

Where the dive site and underwater topography permit, divers often prefer to descend initially to maximum depth and slowly ascend throughout the dive. A slow ascent, and therefore slow pressure reduction, is a good decompression practice. Multi-level decompression calculation takes this into account and does not burden the diver with decompression obligation for all the time not spent at maximum depth, so the decompression schedule will be less conservative than for a square profile for the same maximum depth. Stepped multi-level decompression calculation uses local maximum depth for each sector of the dive, which is more conservative than real time calculations following instantaneous depth profile, but less conservative than for square profiles.

A practice developed of calculating decompression during the dive, using tables printed on a plastic card, to remain within no-decompression limits for multi-level dives. Although this procedure had very little controlled experimental verification, it did appear to be reasonably safe in the field. This may be attributable to the relative conservatism of the tables used.

Dive computers, unlike decompression tables, measure actual depth and time at short intervals during the dive and calculate the exact gas loading and decompression indicated by the decompression model, so their decompression calculations are inherently multi-level at a fine resolution.

==== Repet-Up profile ====
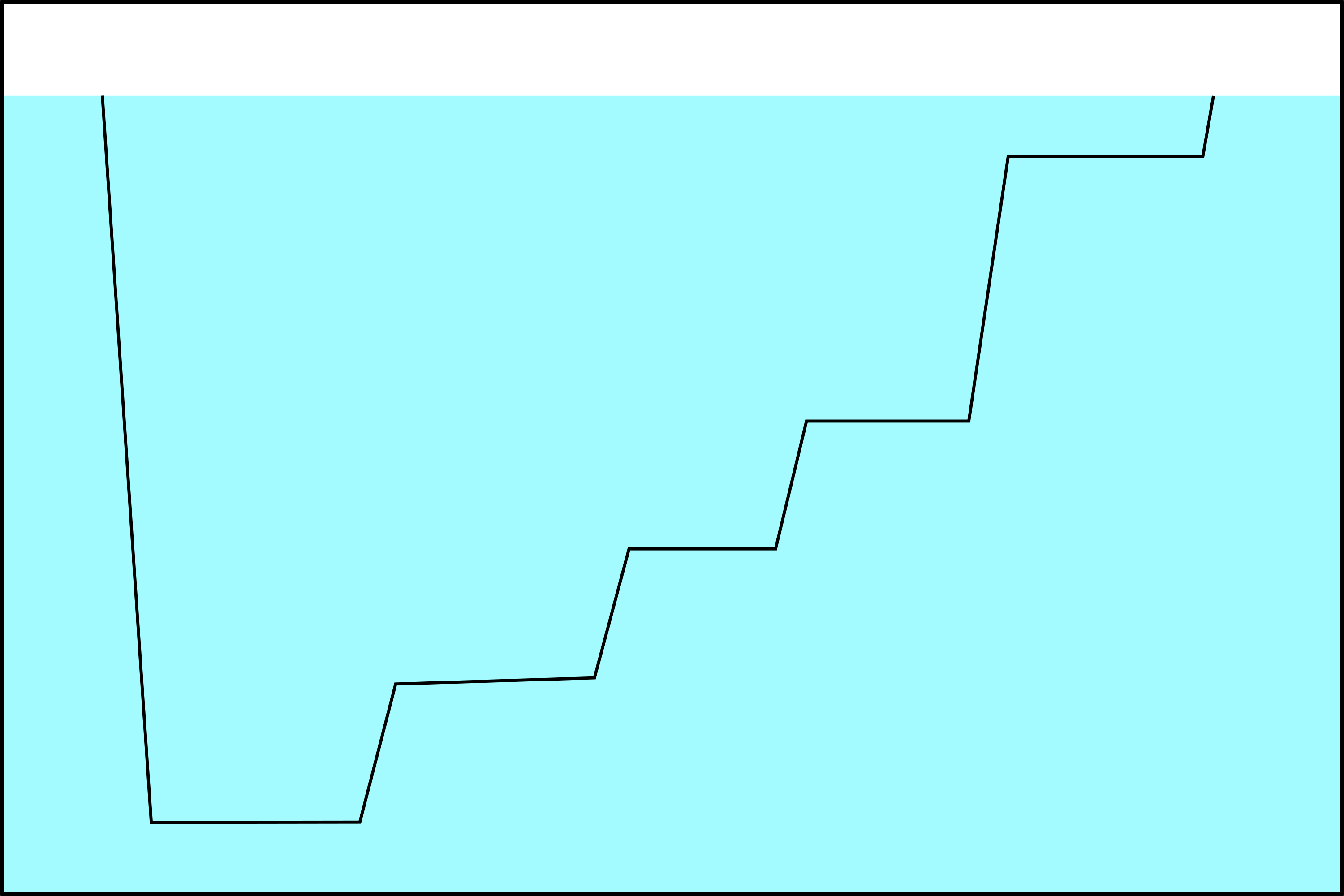
Repet-up dive profile with decompression stop

A commercial diving term for a multi-level dive in which each recorded change of depth is to a shallower depth range. This profile type is used to maximise dive time while limiting decompression time when using decompression tables, but could also use decompression software. At each change of depth range limit the nominal residual inert gas loading is recalculated for the dive to that point by the supervisor, and a new effective dive time established based on the most recent depth limit. The procedure has been shown to be acceptably safe, and is economically advantageous.

==== Hang-off profile ====
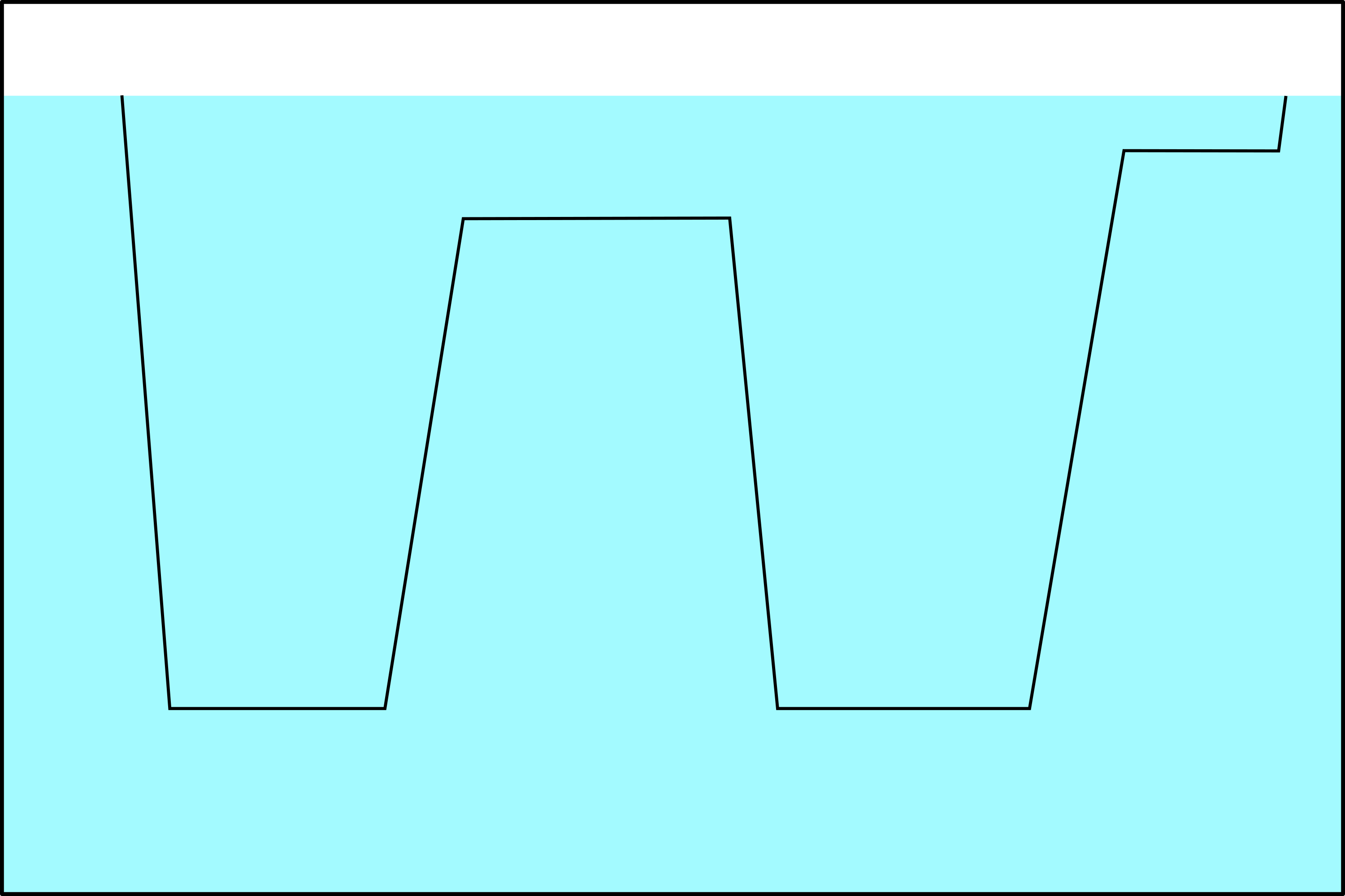
Hang-off dive profile with decompression stop

A hang-off is a procedure used in commercial bounce diving to reduce unnecessary inert gas accumulation during idle periods when the diver is waiting for surface support activity to be completed before the diver's underwater work can continue. During a hang-off the diver ascends to a shallower depth, usually 30 feet (9.1 m), at or below the first decompression stop depth, where ingassing is effectively stopped, and decompression obligation is put on hold, then descends back to the working depth to continue with the job. By its nature, this profile does not apply to recreational diving, but could be used in any surface oriented professional diving application.

=== Repetitive diving ===
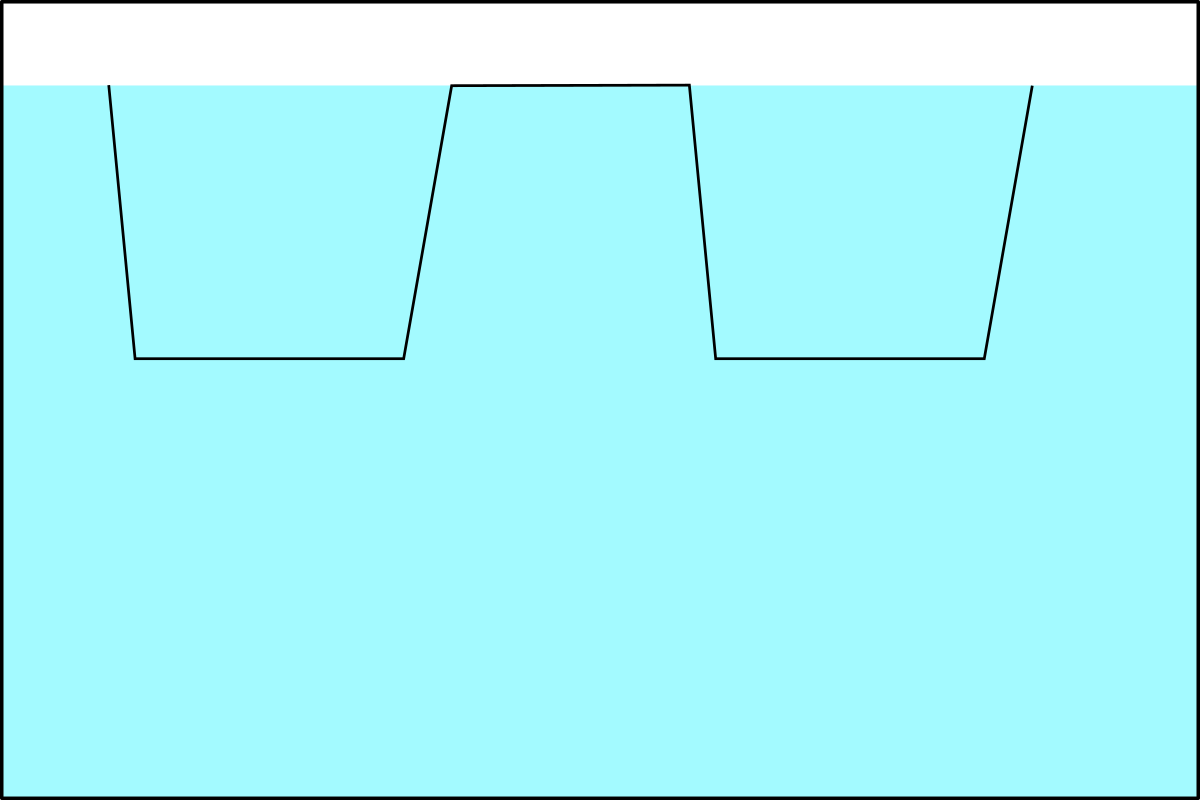
Dive profile of repetitive dives of equal depth

At the surface the remaining excess of absorbed inert gases from the dive is eliminated as time passes. When completely "desaturated" the levels of those gases in the diver's body have returned to those normal at atmospheric pressure. The interval to complete desaturation varies depending upon factors such as the depth and duration of the dive, the altitude of the dive, the gas mixtures breathed on the dive, and the decompression strategy used. The maximum interval until desaturation is considered to have occurred depends on the decompression algorithm in use. On the BSAC 88 dive table it is deemed to take 16 hours. The US Navy tables revision 5 considered the diver unsaturated in 12 hours for normal exposure, and the Buhlmann tables allow 24 hours for the slowest tissues to fully desaturate after a long dive.

Repetitive diving occurs when two dives are separated by a short surface interval, during which the diver has not completely outgassed from the first dive. The gas loading from the first dive must then be taken into account when determining no stop times and decompression requirements for the second dive. Multiple decompressions per day over multiple days can increase the risk of decompression sickness because of the buildup of asymptomatic bubbles, which reduce the rate of off-gassing and are not accounted for in most decompression algorithms.

==== Reverse profile ====
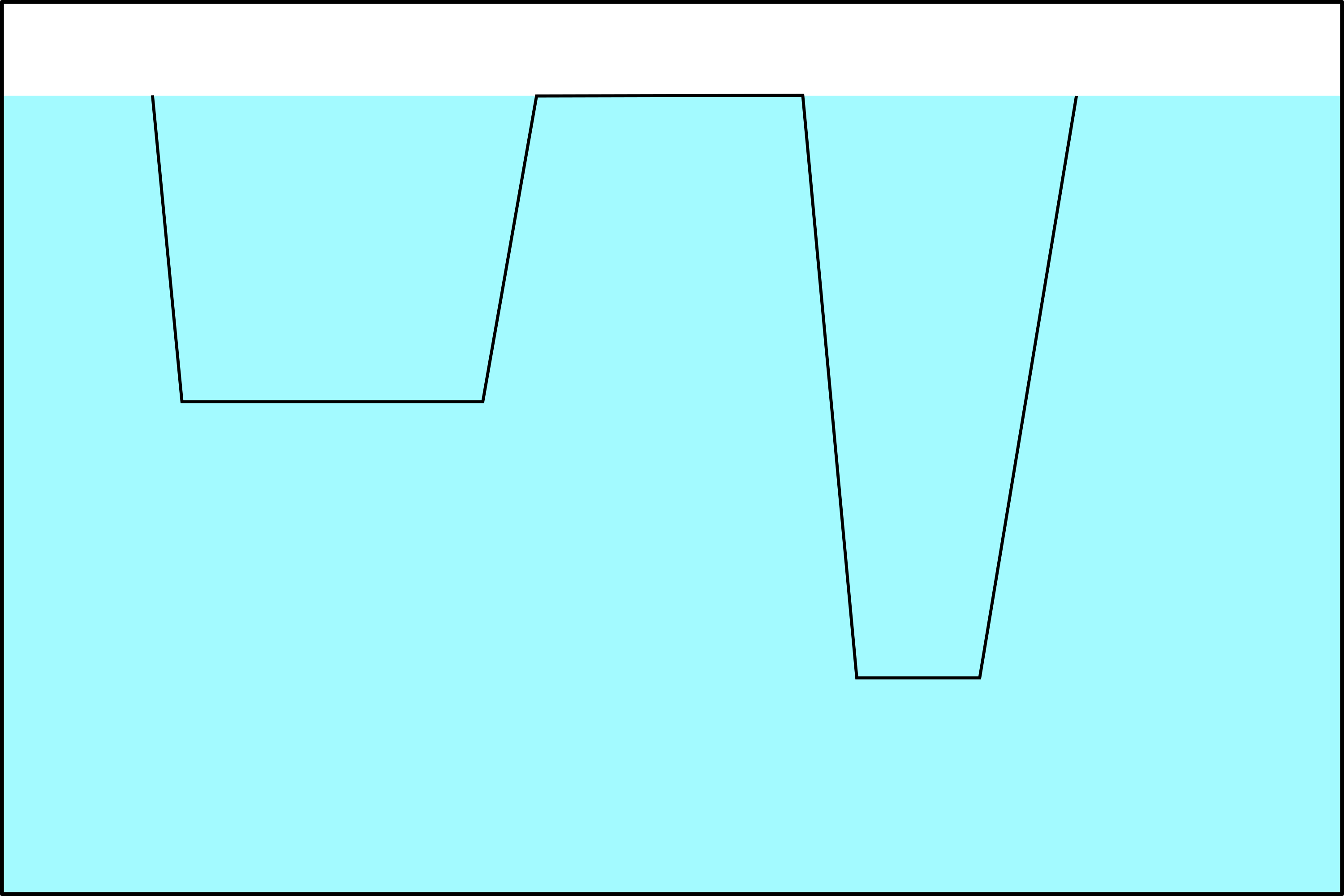
Reverse profile repetitive dive - no decompression stop

Reverse profiles occur when a repeat dive is deeper than the earlier dive. The term is also sometimes used to refer to a single dive profile where the depth generally increases during the bottom phase of the dive until the start of the ascent. Many recreational diver training agencies discouraged or even prohibited reverse profiles for reasons that were not clearly expressed, until the American Academy of Underwater Sciences workshop on reverse dive profiles concluded there was no evidence to support prohibiting reverse dive profiles.

Findings:

- Historically neither the U.S. Navy nor the commercial sector have prohibited reverse dive profiles.
- Reverse dive profiles are being performed in recreational, scientific, commercial, and military diving.
- The prohibition of reverse dive profiles by recreational training organizations cannot be traced to any definite diving experience that indicates an increased risk of DCS.
- No convincing evidence was presented that reverse dive profiles within the no-decompression limits lead to a measurable increase in the risk of DCS.

Michael A. Lang and Charles E. Lehner, Co-Chairs of the Reverse Dive Profiles Workshop, October 29-30.

==== Forward profile ====
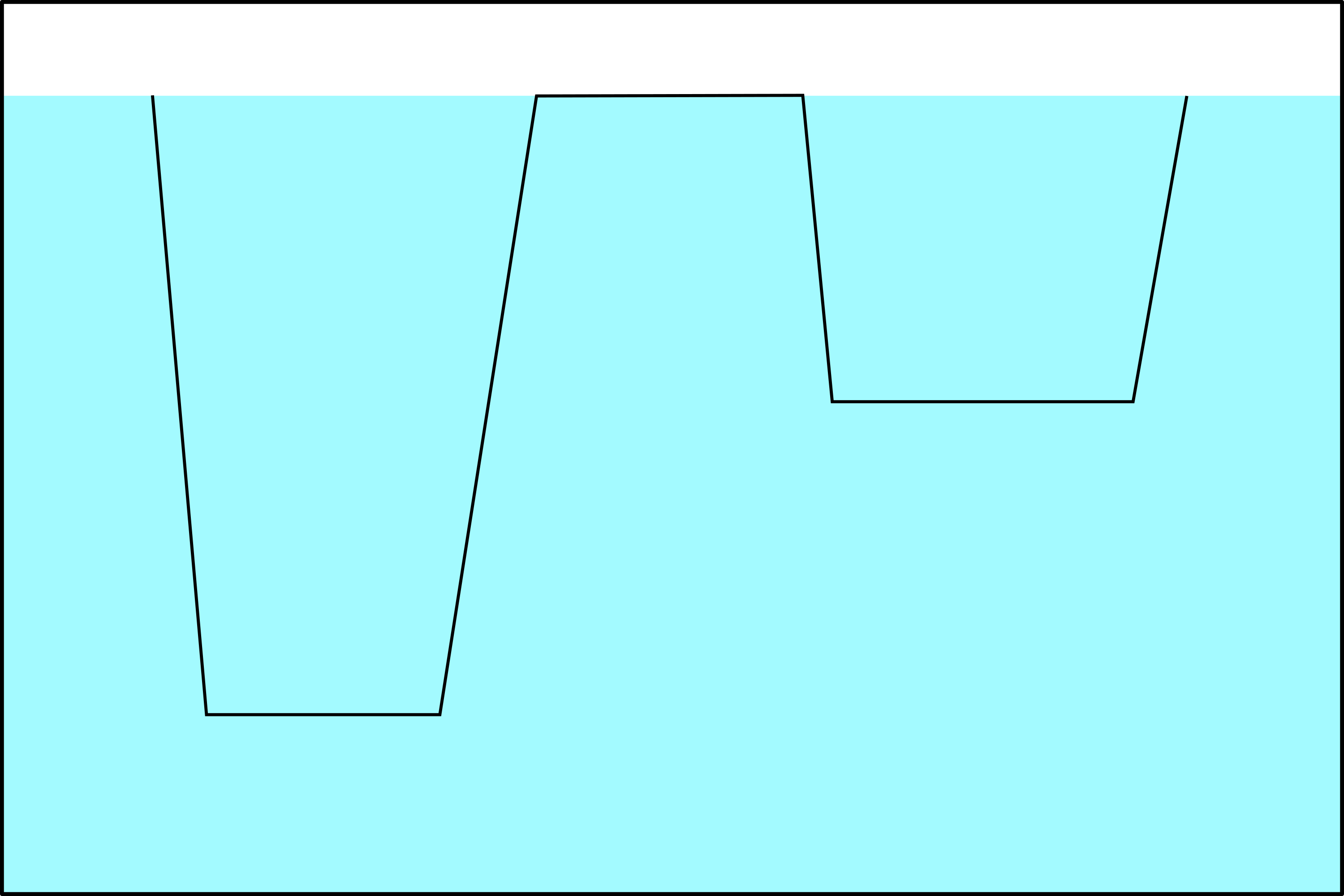
Forward profile repetitive dives - no stop

This term is occasionally used to indicate that a repetitive dive is shallower than the previous dive. This sequence has practical advantages of longer no-stop bottom time, or shorter decompression time than reverse profile dives, but although for several years some of the recreational diver certification agencies promoted this sequence as safer than reverse profile, the claim was not based on evidence, and has been rebutted after examination of the history of the claim and evidence of comparative decompression risk by a panel of experts in 1999.

=== Bounce profile ===
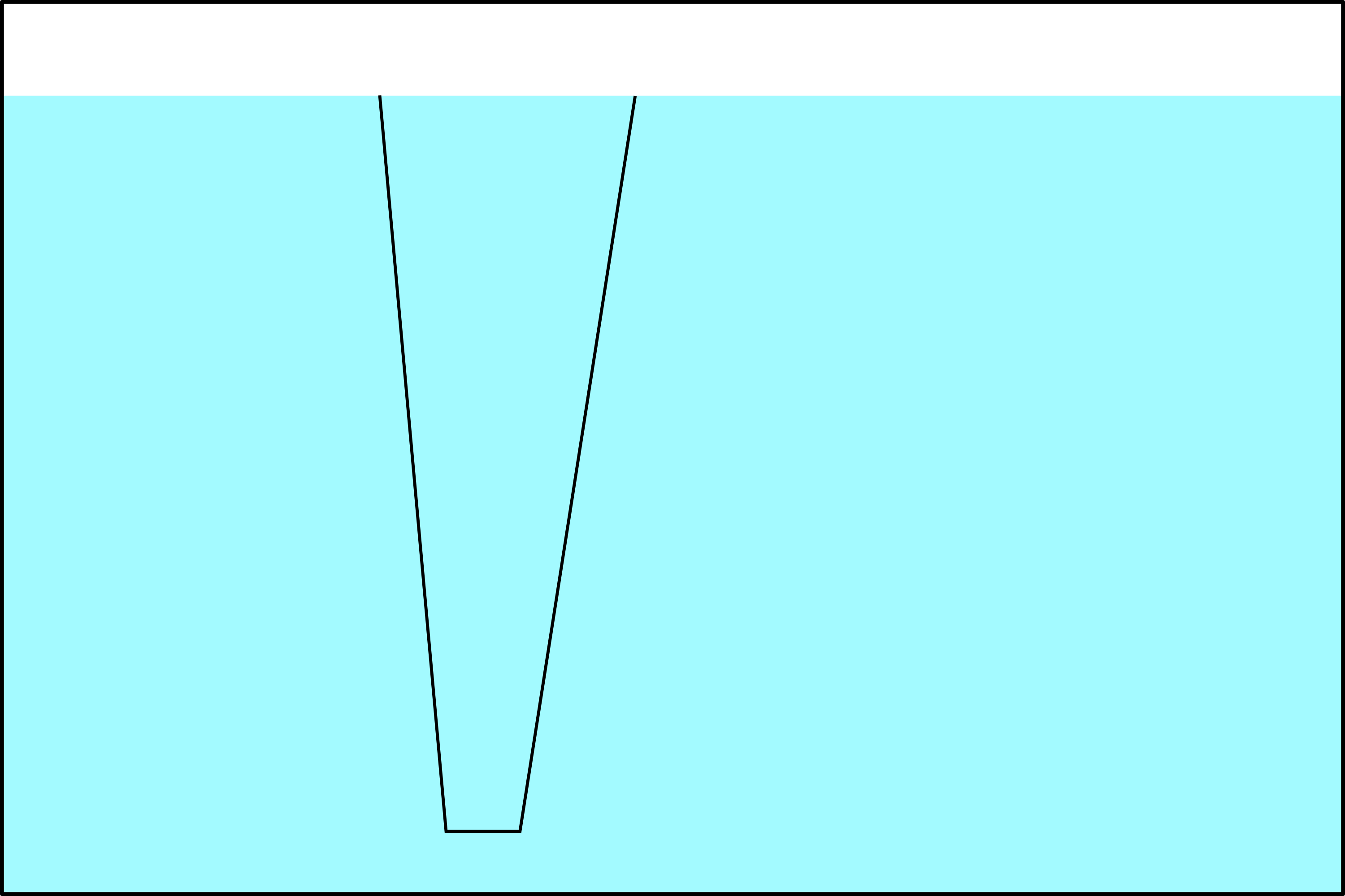
Recreational bounce dive profile

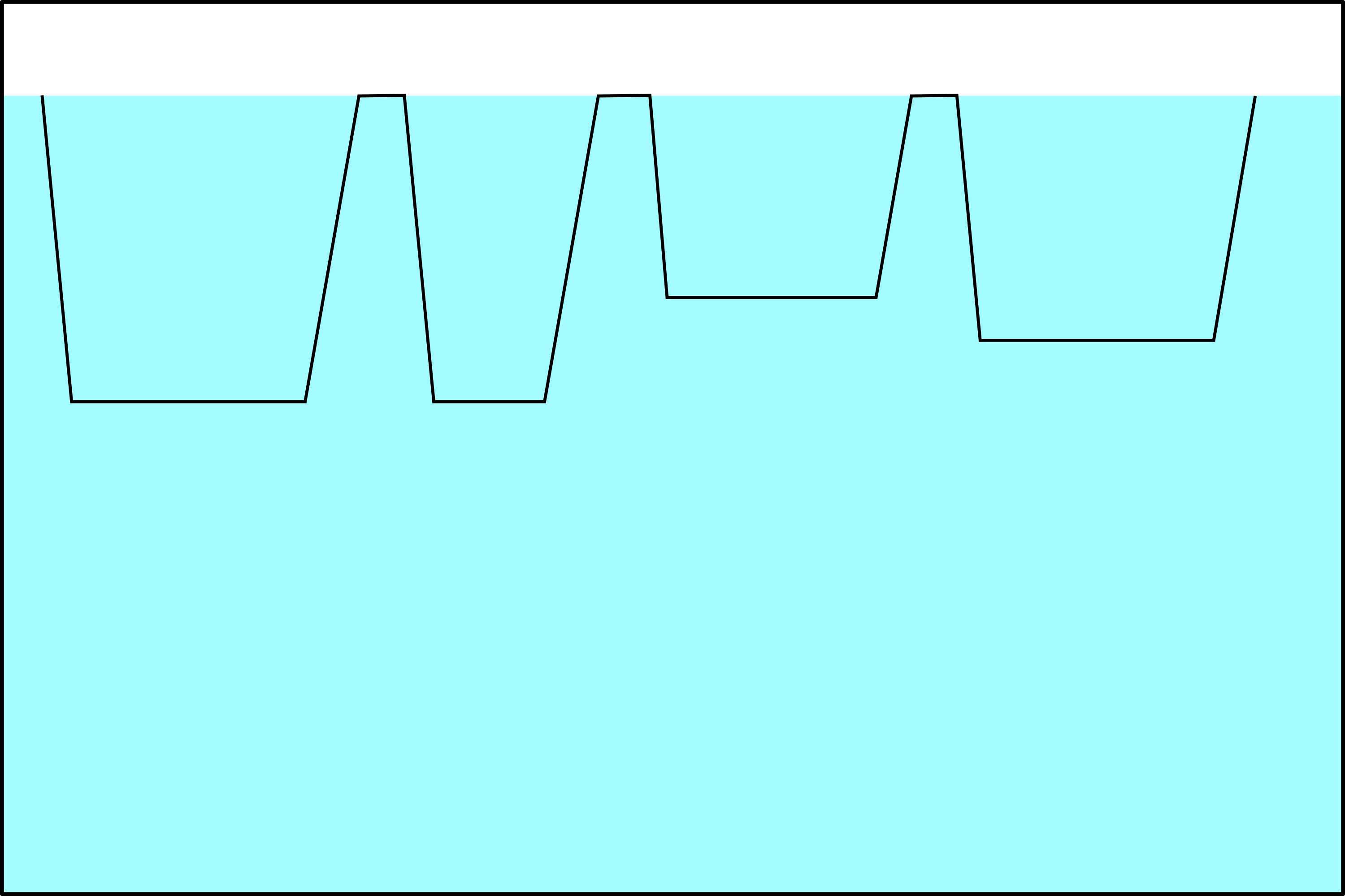
New Zealand occupational bounce dives profile

Bounce dive is a commonly used term, but the meaning of a bounce dive profile depends on context, and can vary considerably.

In recreational diving terminology, in a bounce dive the diver descends directly to the maximum depth, spends very little time at maximum depth and ascends directly to the surface, preferably at an ascent rate recommended by the decompression model used, usually without any obligatory decompression stops.

In technical diving, the ascent may include decompression stops, and the short bottom time may remain a feature. Depth record dives generally follow this profile type to minimise the decompression obligation, which is several hours.

In commercial diving in general, and offshore diving in particular, a bounce dive is any surface oriented dive, in which the diver is decompressed to surface pressure at the end of the dive and does not transfer to a hyperbaric habitat where the diver lives at pressure between dives and only decompresses at the end of a tour of duty. The duration of bottom time is not relevant in this usage, and decompression may be required for long periods.

In New Zealand occupational diving, the term refers to "repetitive diving to depths shallower than 21 m with less than 15 minutes surface interval between consecutive dives". No reference is made to the duration of the dive. In Australian occupational diving it has a similar meaning, and is also referred to as a yo-yo profile.

A bell bounce dive is a dive where the diver is transported to and from the underwater workplace in a closed diving bell or lock-out submersible, and decompressed to surface pressure after the dive, without the use of saturation techniques.

=== Saw-tooth profile ===
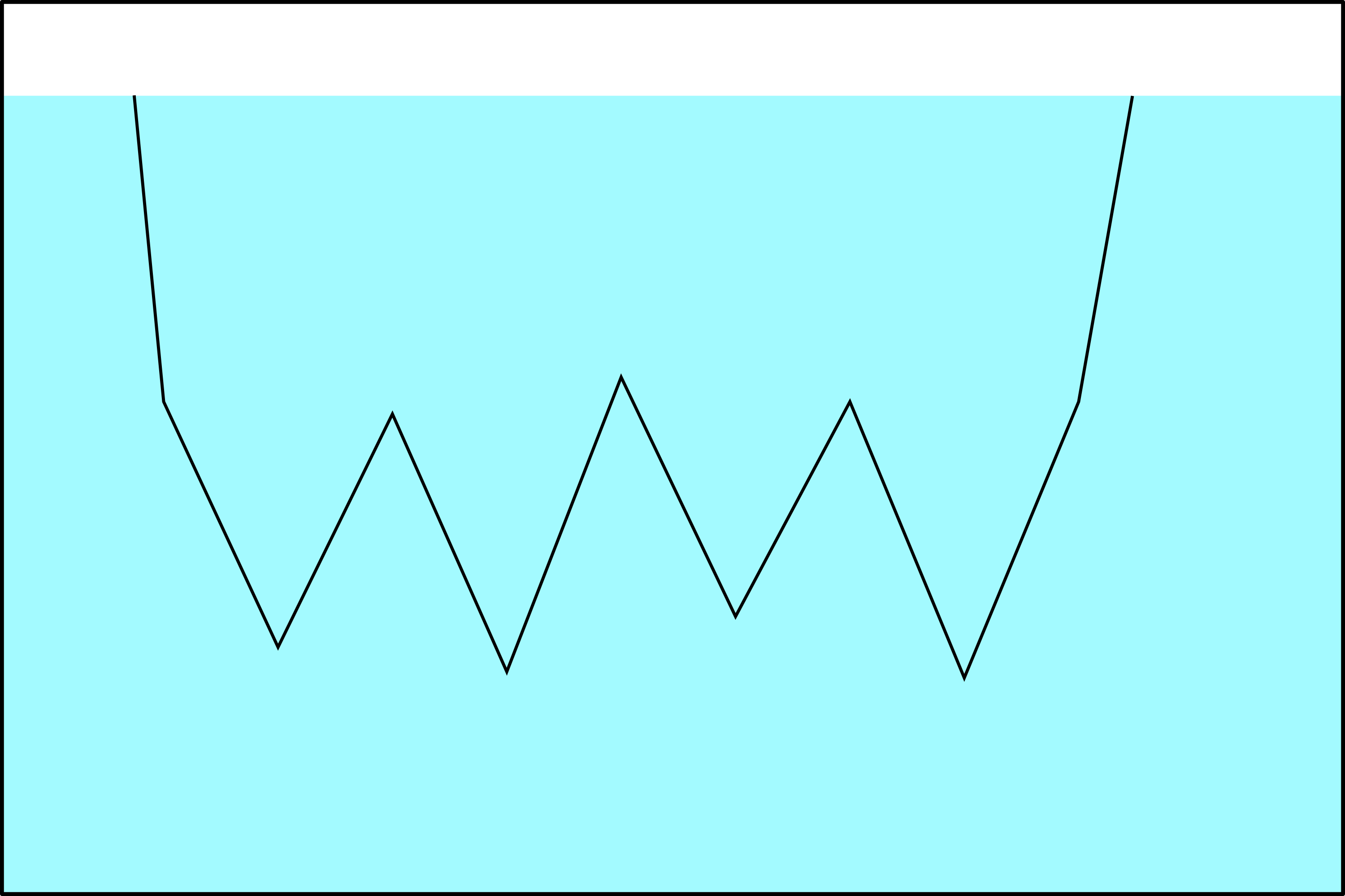
Sawtoothdive profile - no decompression stops

In a saw tooth profile the diver ascends and descends a number of times during the dive. Each ascent and descent increases the risk of decompression sickness if there are any bubbles already in the diver's tissues. The increase in risk depends on the ascent rate, magnitude and duration of the upwards excursion, the saturation levels of the tissues, and to some extent the time spent after returning to depth. Accurate assessment of the increase of risk is not currently (2016) possible, but some dive computers make an adjustment to the decompression requirement based on violations of recommended maximum ascent rate as an arbitrary attempt to compensate. Increased venous bubble counts established by Doppler ultrasound are associated with such profiles.

=== Decompression profile ===
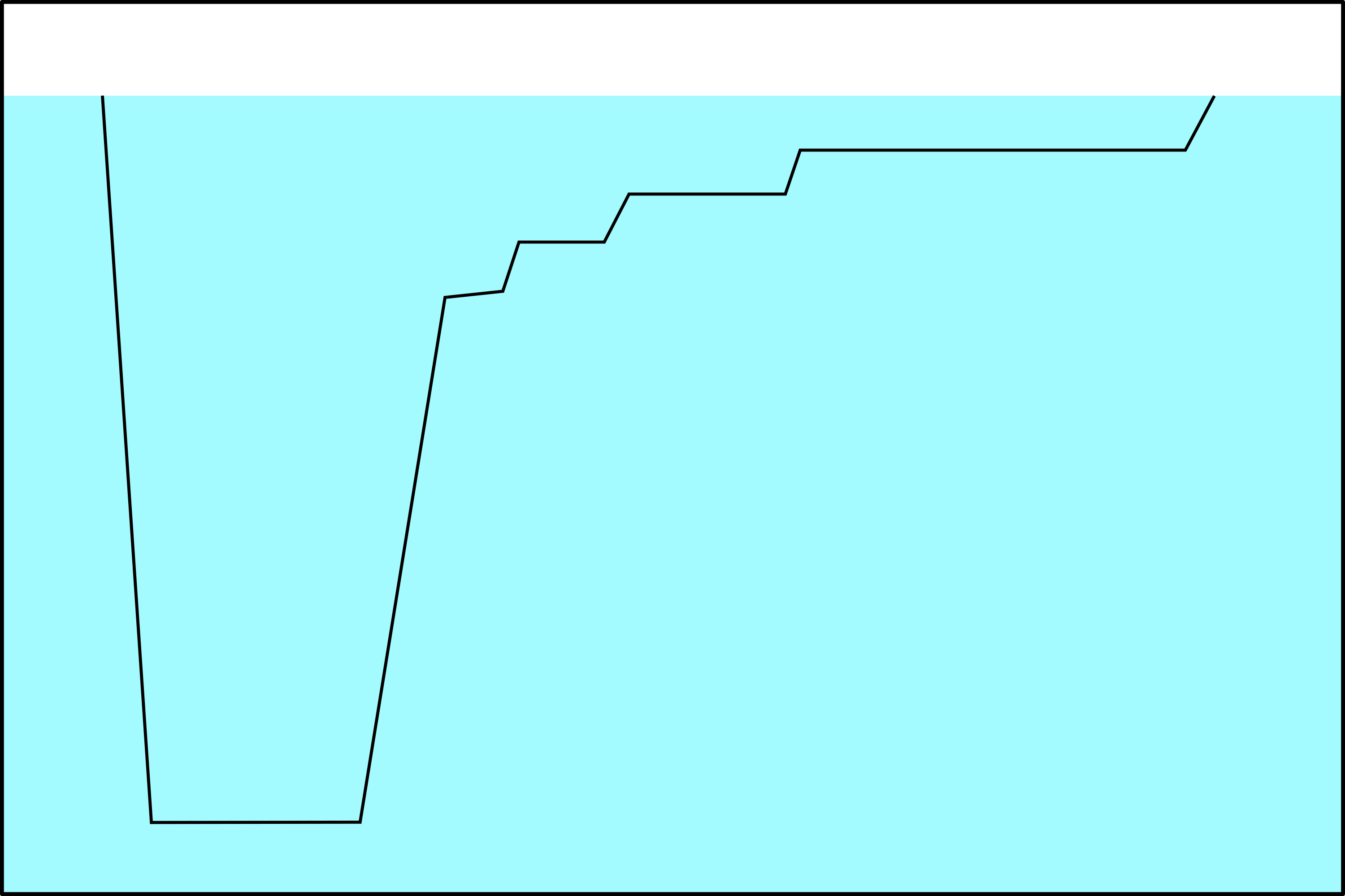
Decompression dive profile

When no stop depth or time limits are exceeded the diver must decompress more extensively than allowed for in the recommended maximum ascent rate to reduce the risk of decompression sickness. This is conventionally done as decompression stops, which are pauses in ascent at specified depths for specified times derived from the decompression algorithm and based on the dive profile history and breathing gas composition. Depth and duration of obligatory decompression stops are specified by the decompression model used. Stops are usually specified in 3-metre (10 ft) steps. The depth of the deepest (first) stop for the same profile history will depend on the algorithm, as some decompression models start decompression at lower supersaturation (lower M-values) than others. The duration of the shallower stops is generally more than the duration of deeper stops on a specific dive. Stops extend the dive profile graph along the time axis.

=== Saturation profile ===
A saturation profile is one which all the tissues considered by the decompression model have become saturated with inert gas from the breathing mixture. Most decompression models will take this to be at six tissue half-times for the slowest tissue considered. Further bottom time at the same depth will not affect the inert gas loading of any tissue and will not affect the decompression required.

==== Excursion from saturation depth ====
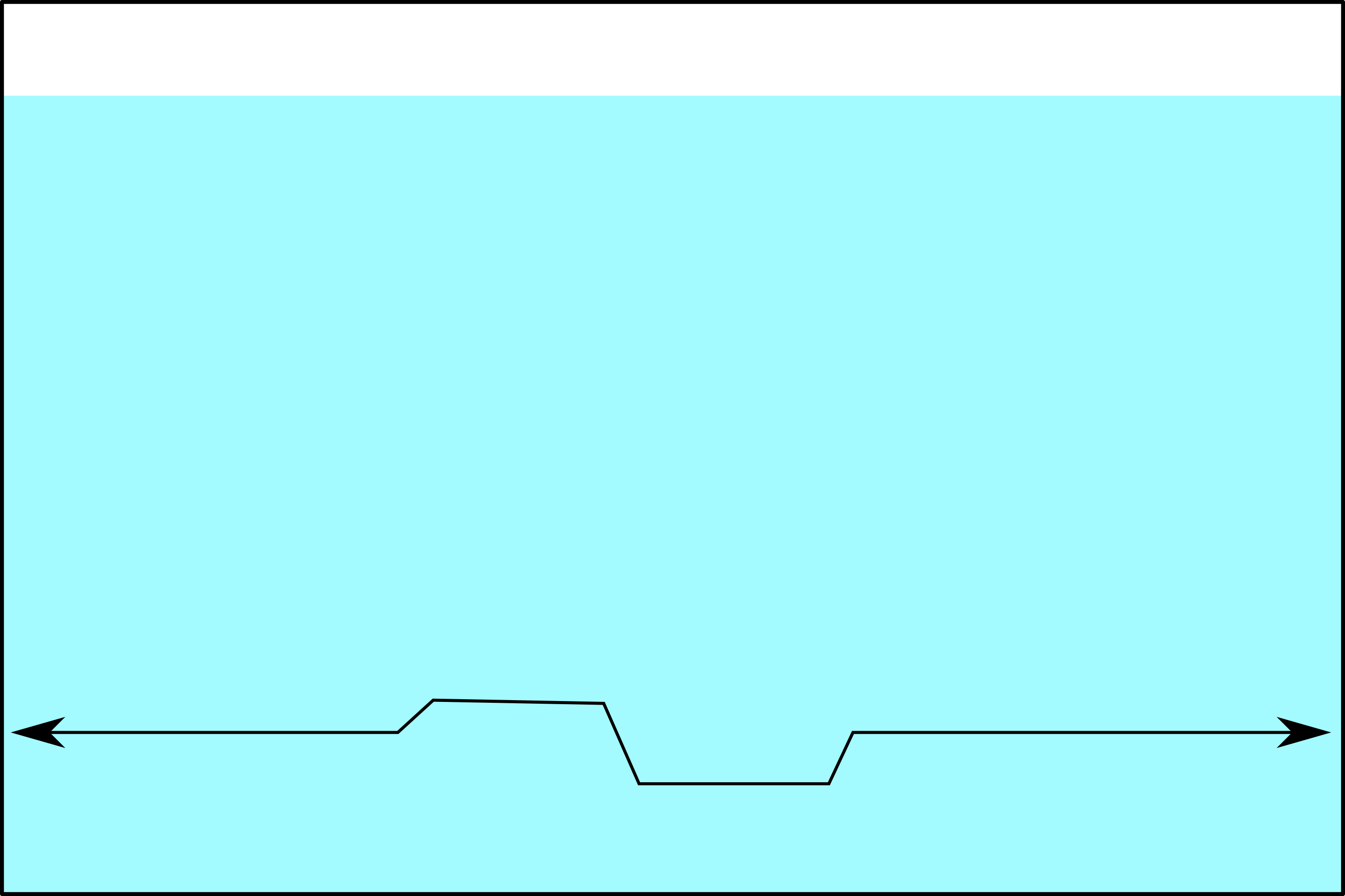
Saturation dive profile with upward and downward excursions from storage depth

An excursion from saturation depth is an upward or downward change of depth during a saturation dive, usually from a closed bell Excursions from a bell are usually limited to depth variations that do not require decompression to return to storage depth nor decompression in water to reach the upper extreme. Dives from an underwater habitat are more likely to involve decompression on downward excursions, as habitat internal pressure is usually not easily varied.

==== Multiple saturation storage depths ====
There can be operational requirements for intermediate compression and/or decompression during a saturation exposure, where the excursion limits do not accommodate the depth range necessary for the work. Multiple decompressions are considered to impose greater physiological stress on the divers, and reduce the advantages of saturation diving, so they are generally limited.

==== "W" saturation profile ====
One intermediate decompression to a shallower storage depth followed by one intermediate compression to a deeper storage depth before final decompression is known as a "W" profile.

==== "V" saturation profile ====
A more restrictive limitation used is to not allow further compression once decompression has been started. This allows sequentially deeper depths until the maximum is reached, but only allows intermediate storage depths that are each shallower than the previous depth, after start of ascent, and is known as a "V" profile,

== Uses of a dive profile ==
A simple record of depth and time for a dive is useful as a legal record of a diving operation, where this is required, and in the case of an accident during the dive, an accurately recorded dive profile can provide useful diagnostic information for treatment of the injured diver and for analysis of the circumstances leading to the accident and the action taken during and after the incident. A proposed dive profile is necessary for effective dive planning, both for estimating the required breathing gas composition and quantities, for planning decompression, and for choosing suitable diving equipment and other logistical aspects.

=== Calculation of gas requirements ===
The breathing gas mixtures appropriate to a dive depend to a large extent on the maximum depth and the decompression obligations incurred by the planned duration of the dive and the time spent at each depth. The quantity of gases required for scuba will depend on the time spent at each depth, the breathing rate of the diver, the type of breathing apparatus to be used, and reasonable allowances for contingencies.

=== Planning and monitoring decompression ===
For planning and monitoring decompression using decompression tables, the input data usually consists of the maximum depth reached during the dive, the bottom time as defined by the dive table in use and the composition of the breathing gas. For repetitive dives it also includes the "surface interval" – the time spent at surface pressure between the previous dive and the start of the next dive. This information is used to estimate the levels of inert gas dissolved in the diver's tissues during and after completing a dive or series of dives. Residual gas may be expressed as a "repetitive group", which is an important input value for planning the decompression for the next dive when using tables. A more detailed and extensive set of residual gas data is stored in the memory of a dive computer, and automatically applied as initial conditions to subsequent dives.

When decompression planning software is used to produce a schedule for a planned dive, the necessary input includes a definition of the dive profile. This may be in as much detail as the user is prepared to provide and the program is capable of using, but will always specify at least maximum depth and bottom time, and may go into detail regarding recent dive history, multiple levels, gas switches, altitude and personal conservatism factors. Many dive computers have a dive planning function for which the diver selects a maximum depth and the computer displays the maximum bottom time for which no decompression stops are required.

==== Ambient pressure at the surface ====
Atmospheric pressure changes due to change of altitude before or after diving can have a significant influence on decompression risk. Diving at high altitude requires special consideration in decompression planning. Such variations in ambient pressure caused by flying or surface travel involving changes in altitude will affect decompression and should be considered during dive planning and therefore may influence a planned dive profile.

== Records ==
The dive profile is often recorded in some way as part of a permanent record of the dive. Maximum depth, bottom time and any decompression required are routinely logged by most professional divers, for whom it may be a legal requirement, and by many recreational divers, for whom it is usually a recommendation of the training agencies.

Recreational diving paper logbooks frequently provide a simple graphic representation of a dive profile for recording the details of a dive which are necessary for planning a repetitive dive using a specified set of dive tables. Digital diving logs such as the freeware Subsurface and various proprietary packages from diving computer manufacturers may display a graphic representation of the dive profile downloaded from the dive computer.
