= Glossary of underwater diving terminology =

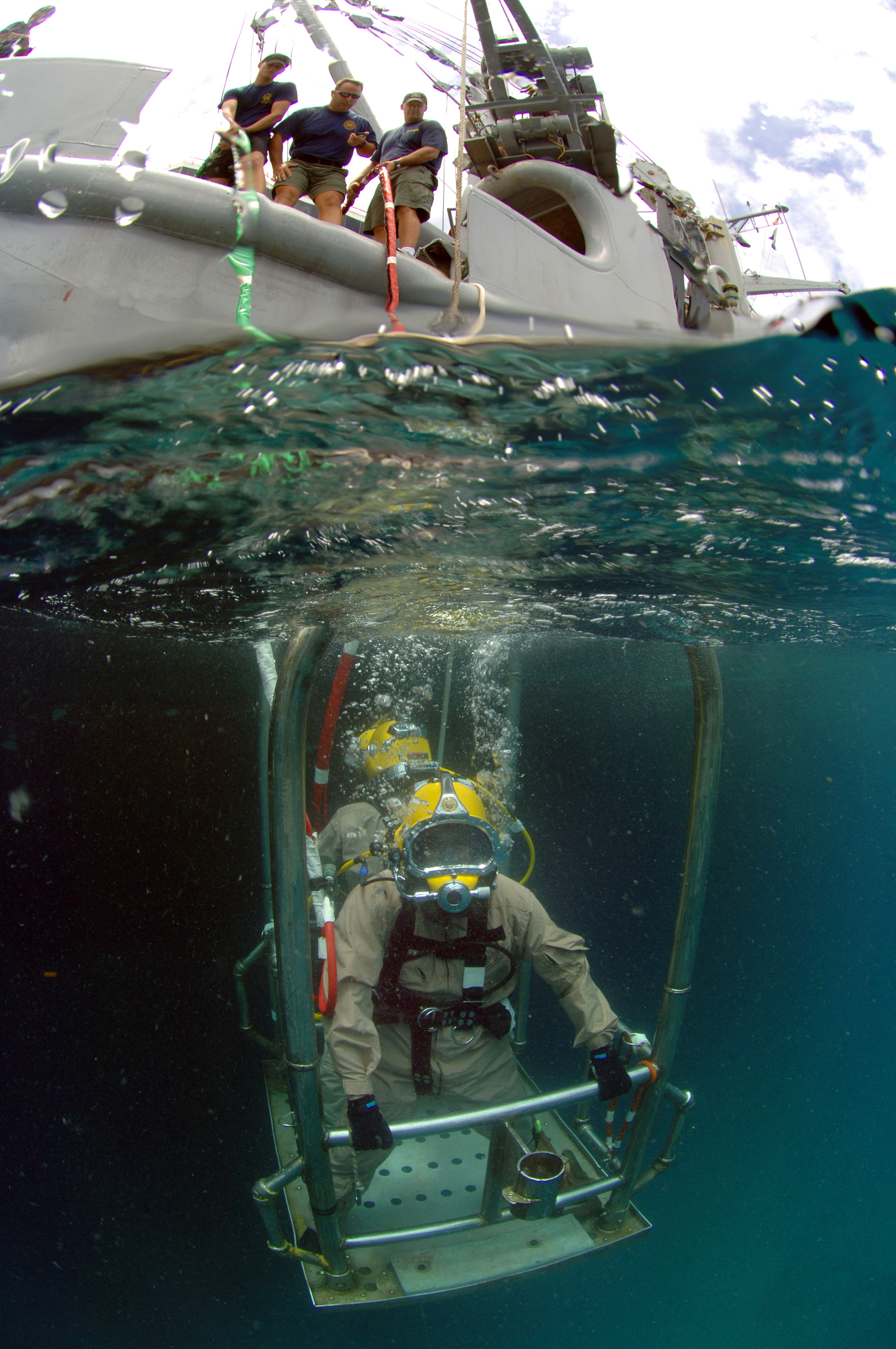
Surface-supplied divers riding a stage to the underwater workplace

This is a glossary of technical terms, jargon, diver slang and acronyms used in underwater diving. The definitions listed are in the context of underwater diving. There may be other meanings in other contexts.

The appeal of underwater diving as a human activity is usually associated with the view into an underwater environment that is typically inaccessible in daily life on land. Practitioners submerge below the surface of the water for a range of purposes, such as recreation, underwater photography, exploration of marine biology and nautical archaeology, search for shipwrecks, and other types of research.

Underwater divers may use no equipment at all, or a wide range of equipment which may include breathing apparatus, environmental protective clothing, aids to vision, communication, propulsion, maneuverability, buoyancy and safety equipment, and tools for the task at hand.

Many of the terms are in general use by English speaking divers from many parts of the world, both amateur and professional, and using any of the modes of diving. Others are more specialised, variable by location, mode, or professional environment. There are instances where a term may have more than one meaning depending on context, and others where several terms refer to the same concept, or there are variations in spelling. A few are loan-words from other languages.

There are five sub-glossaries, listed here. The tables of content should link between them automatically:

- Glossary of underwater diving terminology: A–C
- Glossary of underwater diving terminology: D–G
- Glossary of underwater diving terminology: H–O
- Glossary of underwater diving terminology: P–S
- Glossary of underwater diving terminology: T–Z
