= Gordon Smith (inventor) =

Inventor of KISS diving rebreather, born 1950

Gordon Smith (born Flin Flon, Manitoba, Canada 1950, died January 9, 2006) was an inventor, machinist and tool and die maker notable for inventing the KISS diving rebreather.

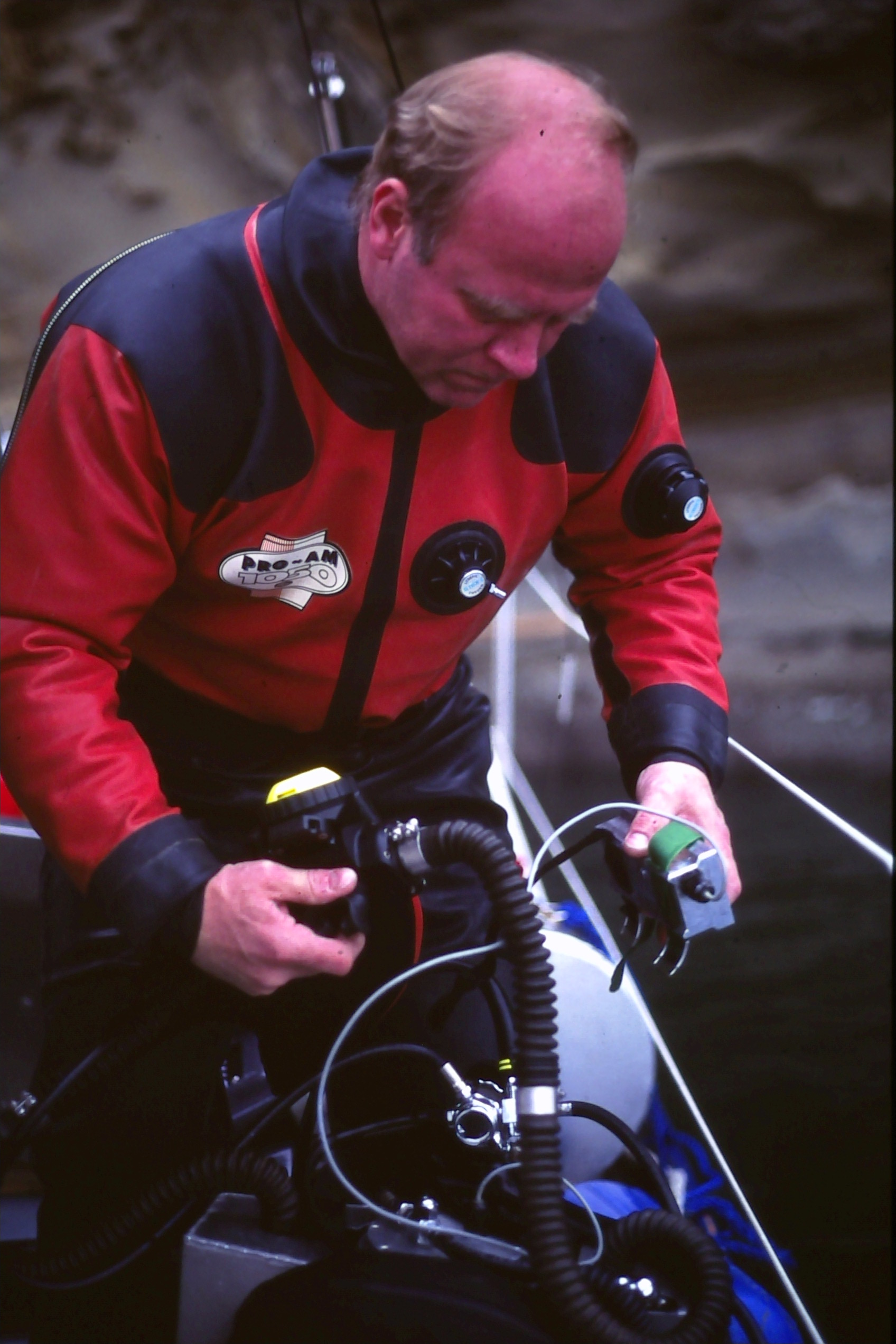
Gordon Smith with his prototype closed circuit rebreather

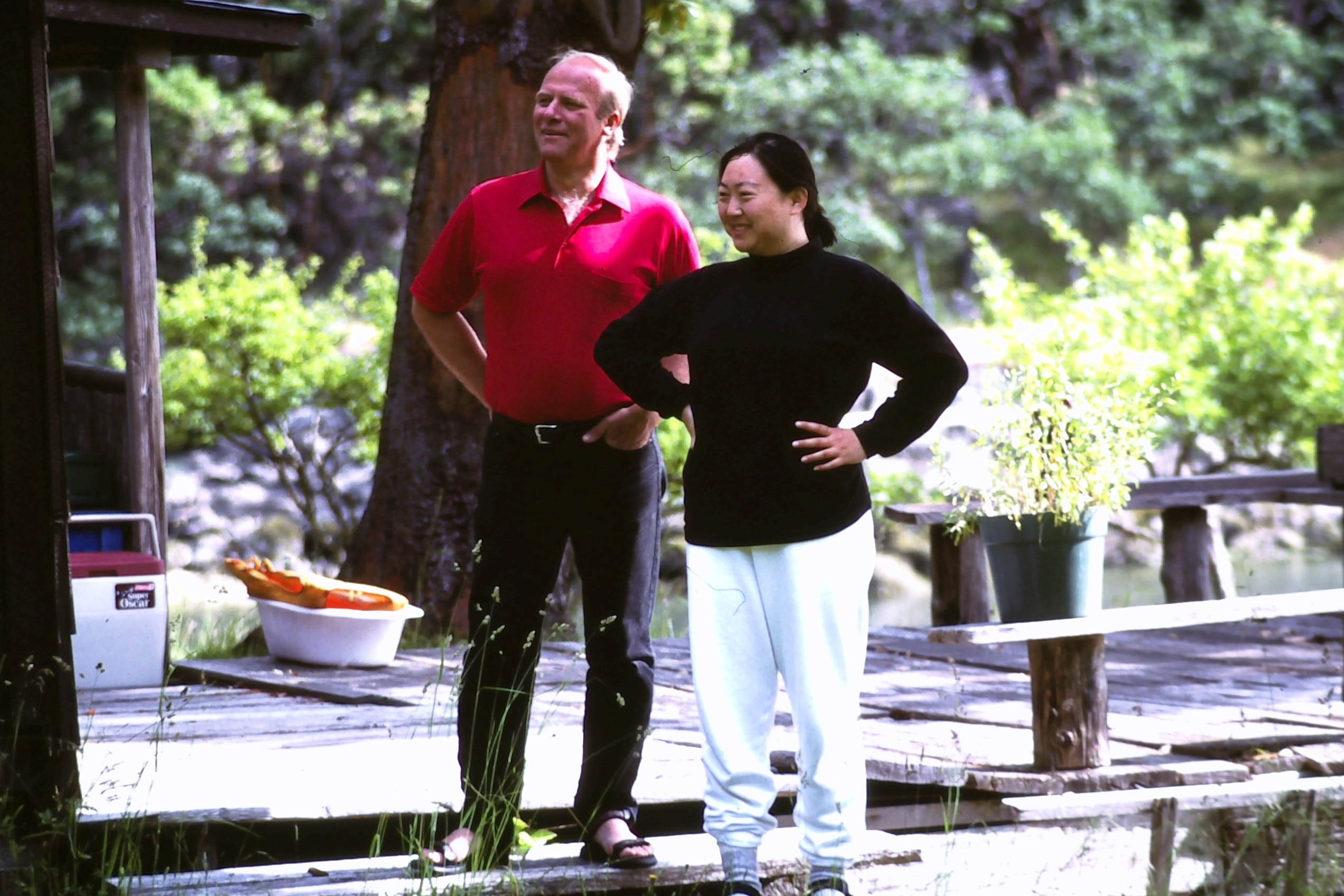
Gordon Smith, Inventor (1995 image)

== Professional history ==
Gordon Smith was trained as a tool and die maker at C. A. Norgren, Littleton, Colorado. He returned to Canada in 1975 and went to work for Comptec International Ltd., a two color molding company, in Vancouver, British Columbia. Gordon Smith spent fourteen years at Comptec and moved from the position of Mold Maker to become manager of the Tooling, Engineering, and R&D departments. During this period he was responsible for increasing the machine operator output by a factor of 6. He also helped move Comptec into the telecommunications business and developed production systems for assembly of telephones which are in use today by almost every major telephone manufacturer in the world.

Gordon Smith left Comptec in 1989 to start Kiss Manufacturing. In the late 1990s he invented and began producing the KISS line of diving rebreathers under the Jetsam Technologies name.

== KISS Rebreather development ==
Gordon's was an avid scuba diver in the Pacific Northwest, diving all around British Columbia in his boat "Ferrous". In the mid-1990s, technical diving became a movement which provided some background on some commercially available rebreathers - very expensive and challenging to obtain at the time. Finding that his dives were limited by the size of his tanks (generally consuming two tanks for every regular divers one), and being interested in the technology, self-taught, and the owner of his own machine shop, he had the means and technical ability to begin exploring the design and construction of his own rebreathers. There were virtually no certification agencies that could address non-military rebreathers and certainly no clear path forward towards acceptance of their use in recreational diving. For example, few charters at the time had the ability or the experience to accommodate rebreather divers (often relying upon live boats following bubble streams and with a business model based upon dives lasting under one hour). However, because Gordon's initial aim was simply restricted to diving on his own boat with individuals of his choosing he was able to proceed with developing these experimental devices without the burden and limitations of (self) regulatory considerations.

The first attempt in 1998 was a novel approach, with a unique piston serving as counterlungs rather than the conventional flexible bags. The approach was intended to use tank pressure to compensate for the o-ring friction and inertia of the displacing water. Although the o-ring friction in air was acceptable, the model could not handle the inertia of the necessary water displacement. The prototype suffered from excessive work of breathing and did not pass test of surface breathing while submerged for even a few minutes. It got him started however, and nevertheless had the dubious description of "looking like R2D2 making love to an octopus" according to Gordon.

His next prototype was a semi-closed design again, but this time with more conventional flexible counterlungs. This worked very successfully, and was dove for many months. However, with the experience he gained with the semi-closed designs, he saw that the fully closed system was certainly feasible and much more desirable in terms of performance. He quickly decided upon the merit of including an oxygen sensor due to the risk of inadvertent hypoxia if required to exercise at the surface. One of his innovations early on was the bailout-integrated mouthpiece, switching immediately to diluent for short term open-circuit operation in an emergency or even just upon entering the water. He also incorporated a regulator to prevent negative loop pressure should the counterlungs become fully deflated upon descent.

Gordon devised his fully closed rebreather system in 1998. One of his key contributions was to realize that the formidable electronics engineering required to automate control of the loop partial pressure of oxygen was neither required nor necessarily the best way to minimise the risk of hypoxia or hyperoxia. Instead, a constant mass flow orifice injected oxygen continually at a rate slightly under the divers basal metabolic rate - requiring only periodic top-ups by the diver. This was the KISS principle, the philosophy by which the diver was counter-intuitively made safer by removing electronic protections. Specifically, design philosophy was that the knowledge that the diver was the one and only thing controlling the loop oxygen level meant that attention was required and would be applied. This avoided the human tendency to eventually neglect to monitor the machine-controlled process outputs, which work seamlessly until there is a failure or mistake (whether software bug, miscalibration or other issue) and then cause an accident. In practice, the constant mass flow of oxygen meant that partial pressures changed so slowly that this form of manual control was actually very feasible and only required checking every few minutes (more often during exercise and when close to the surface perhaps). He developed a successful prototype, initially using two oxygen sensors in two separate larger blocks. With the availability of miniature readouts, he advanced the design to use a triple oxygen sensor system in order to allow there to be a "voting ability" for which sensor was malfunctioning if there was an error in one. He continued to innovate, including at one time experimenting with a "hands-free" tongue-based oxygen injection system he wryly called the "snog valve". He then perfected the system over several years, building further prototype units that were test dived by friends Natasha Dickinson and Daniel Reinders. In time he came to see the potential for commercial sales of the system, and began Jetsam technologies. Over time, he would begin to explore also a smaller recreational-sized version of the KISS rebreather as well. He also pursued a pneumatic air booster system for rebreathers, whereby partially full standard scuba cylinders could be used to top-up the smaller rebreather cylinders without the need for a motorized compressor.

The KISS brand was continued after his death, and was eventually acquired by the Darkwater Group, which also owns XDEEP and SEAL Drysuits, in 2020, to develop the KISS Sidewinder rebreather into the KISS Sidewinder 2.

== Gallery ==
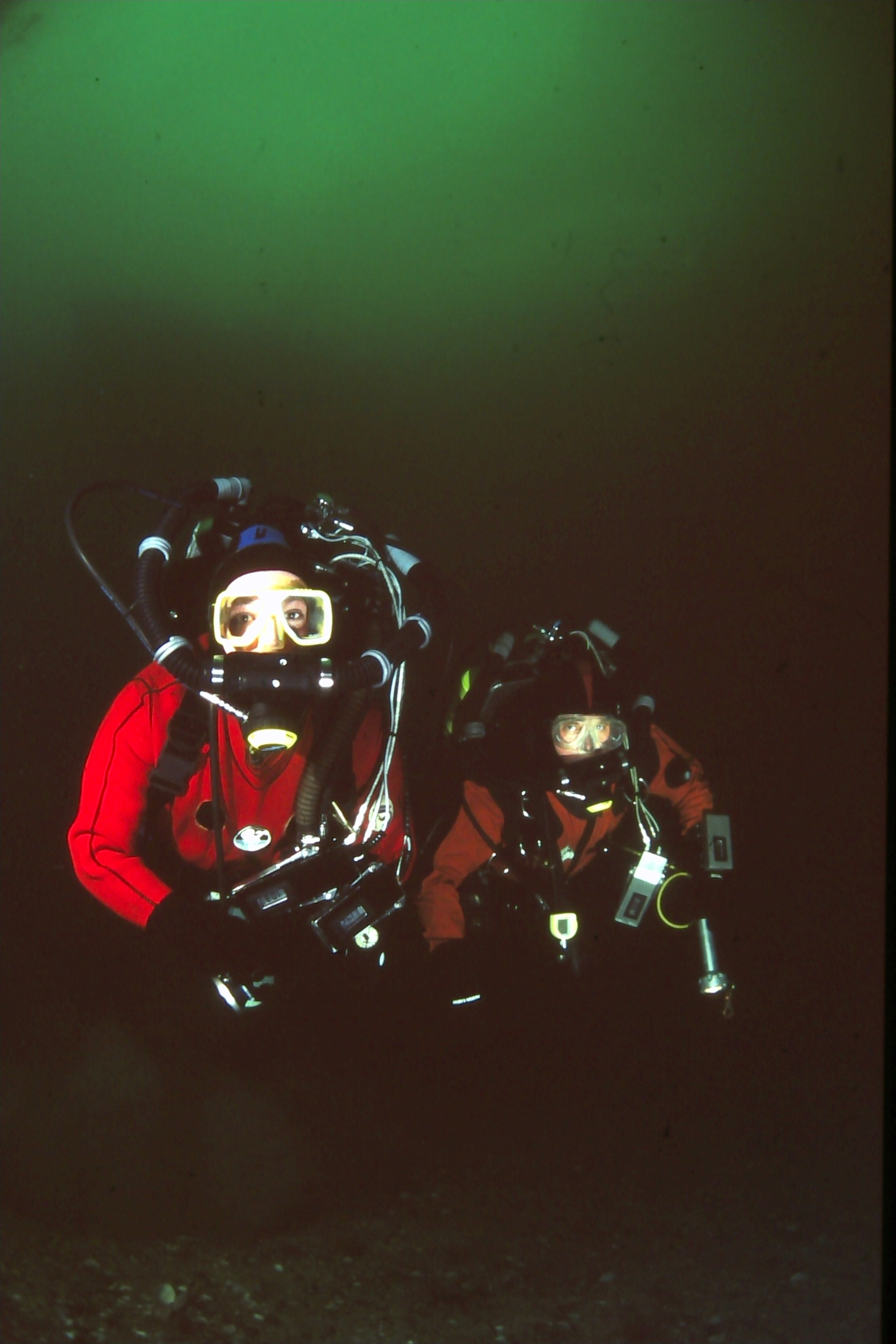
Gordon Smith (behind) with his prototype closed circuit rebreather with diver Daniel Mayes (foreground)

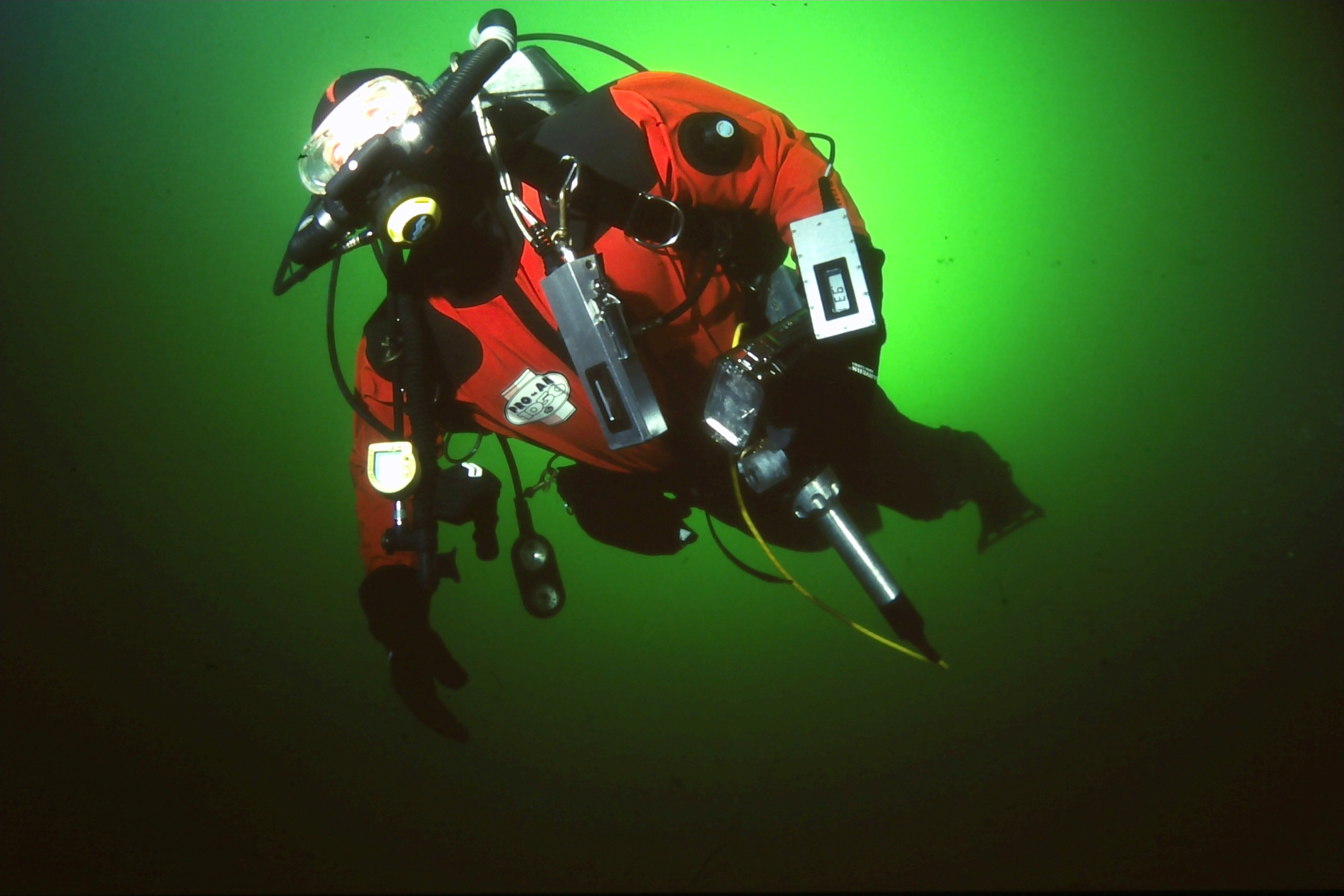
Gordon Smith with his prototype semi-closed circuit rebreather

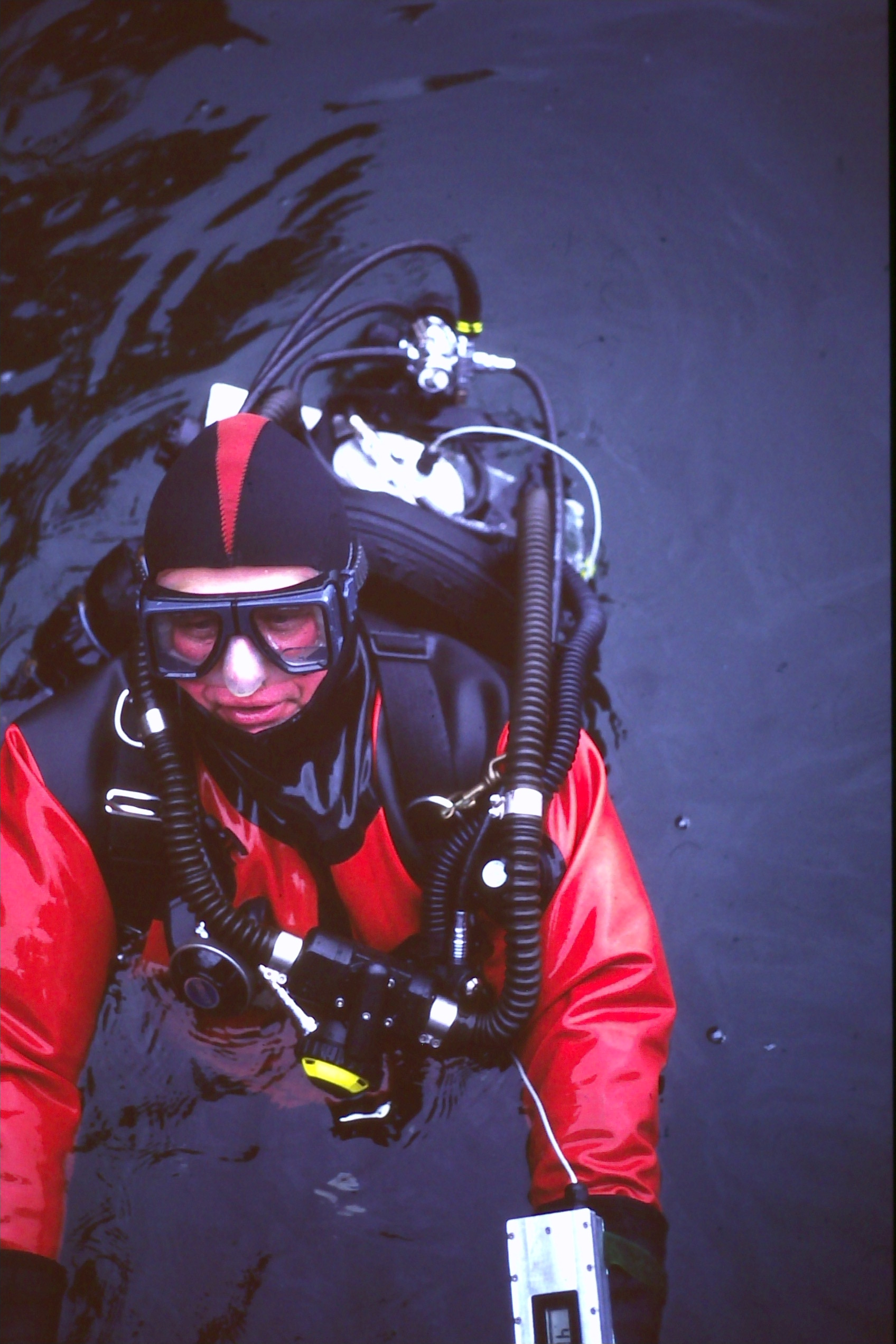
Gordon Smith with his prototype closed circuit rebreather

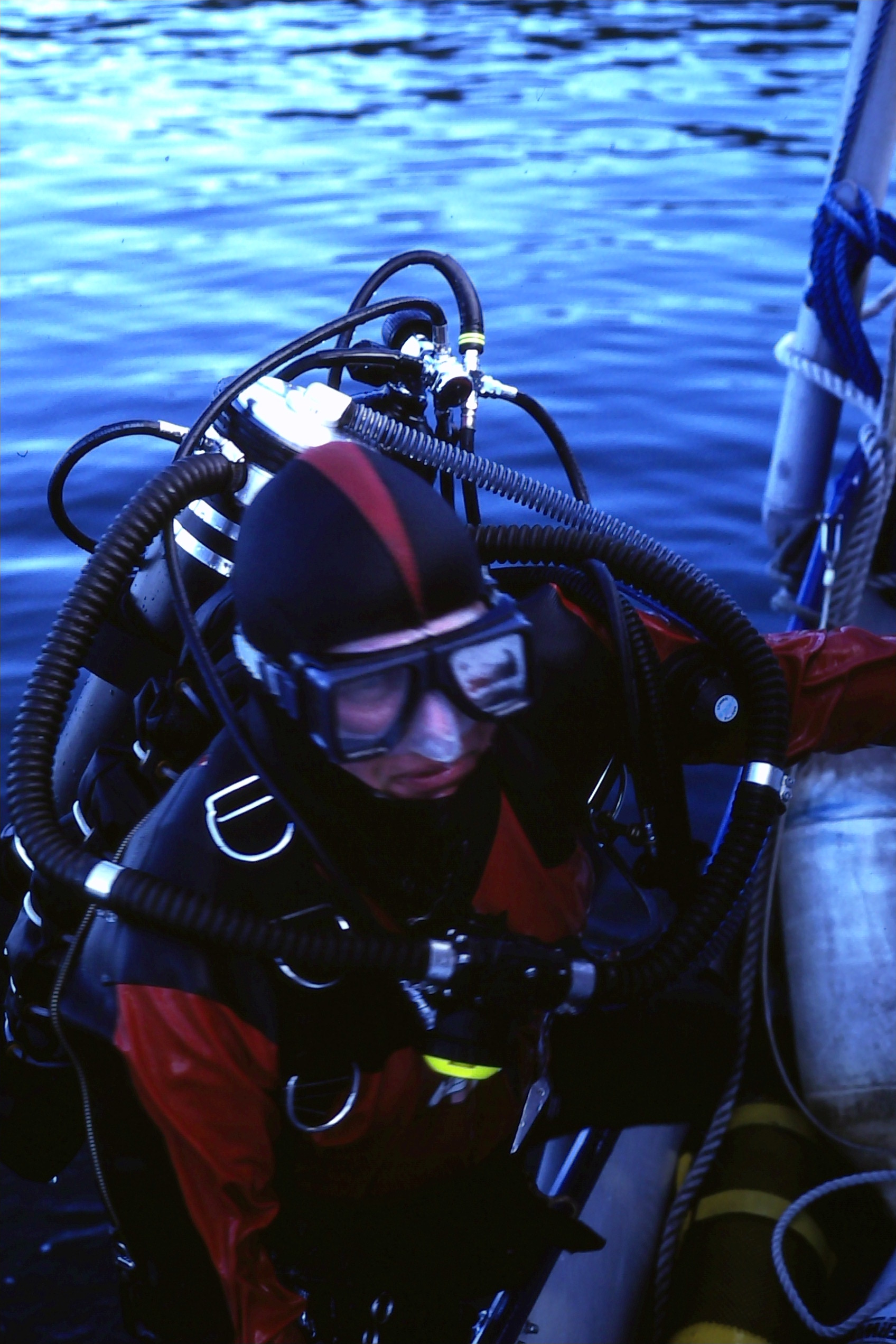
Gordon Smith with Semi-closed Circuit Prototype - piston counterlung

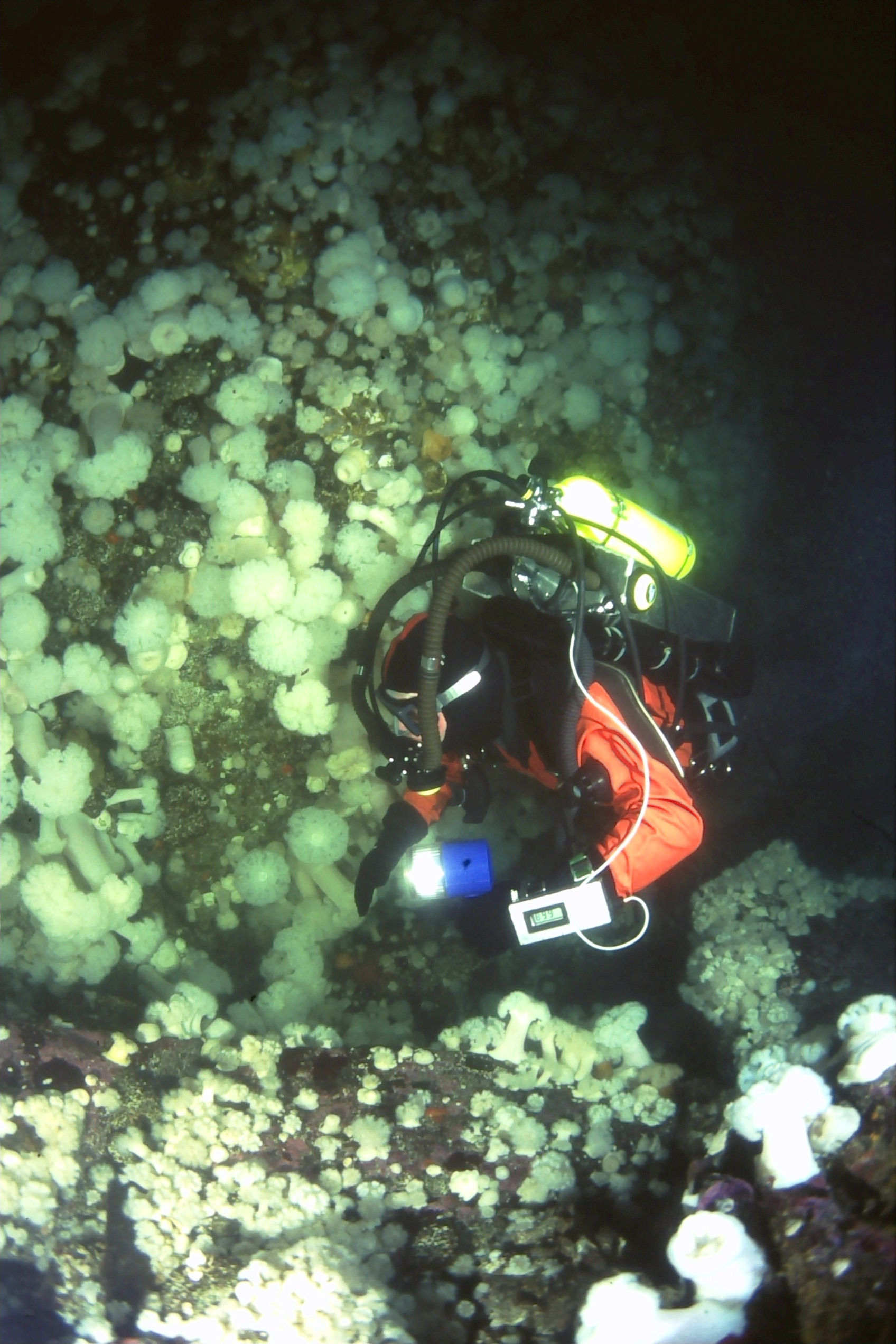
Gordon Smith with Semi-closed Circuit Prototype

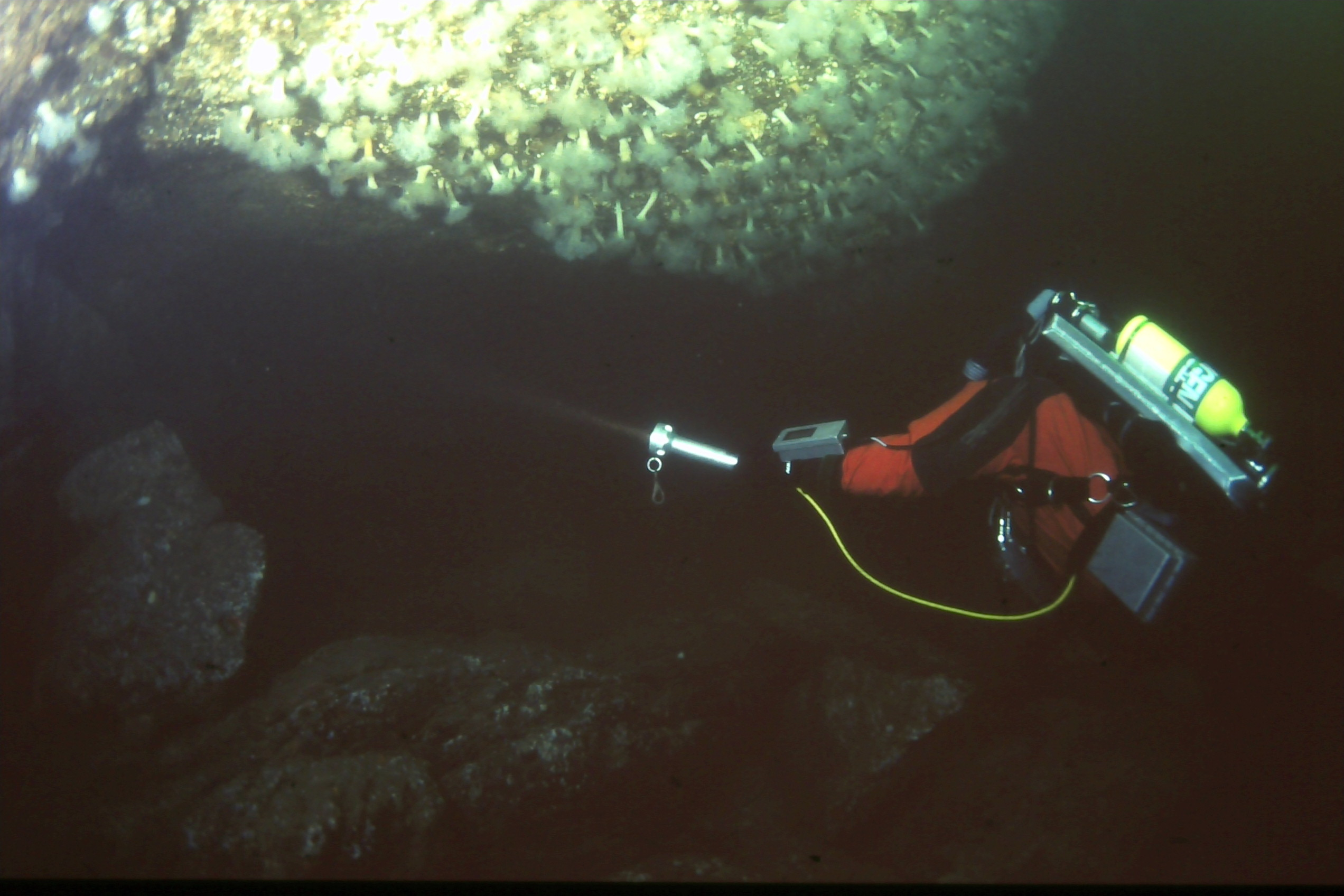
Gordon Smith with his prototype semi-closed circuit rebreather

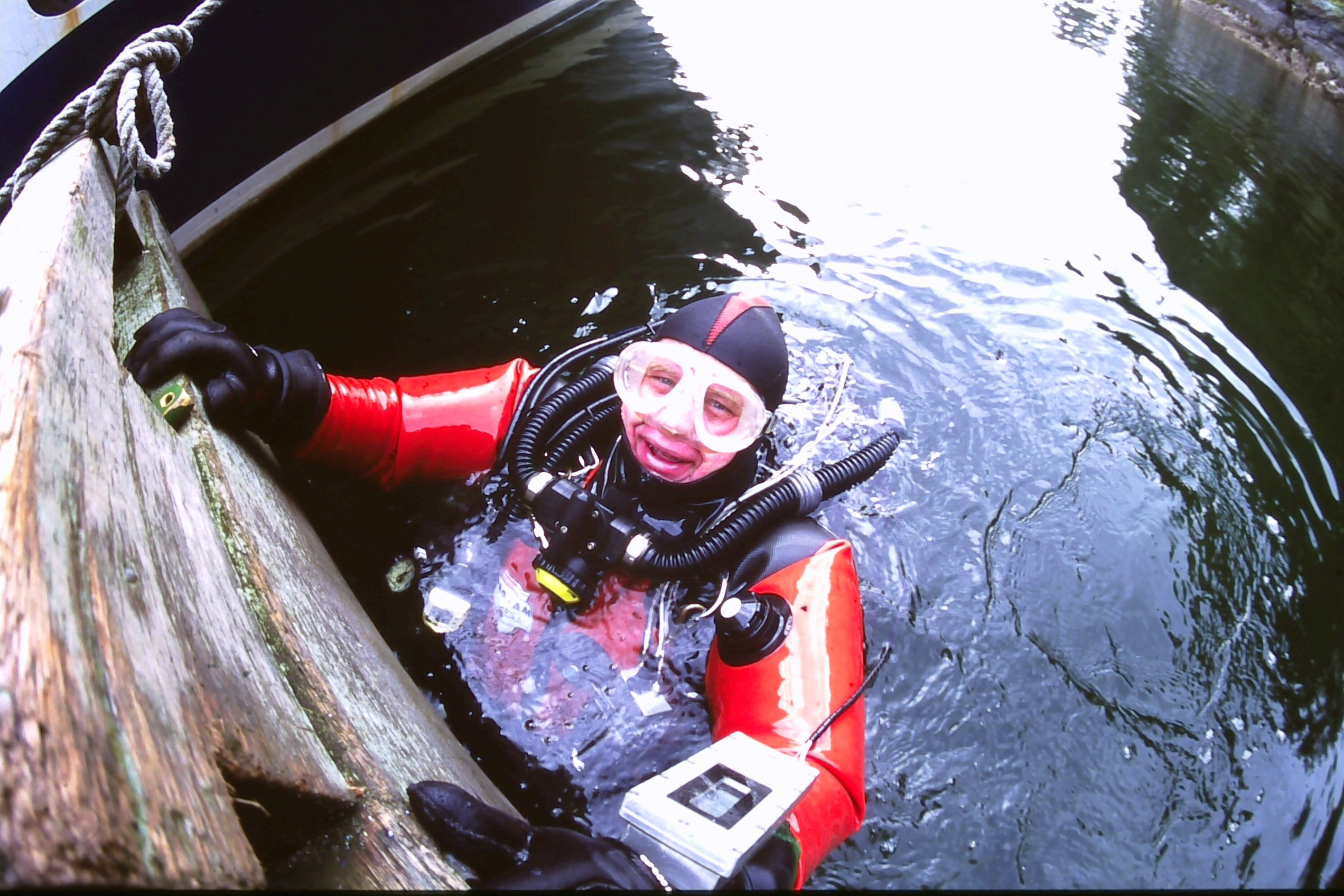
Gordon Smith with his prototype closed circuit rebreather

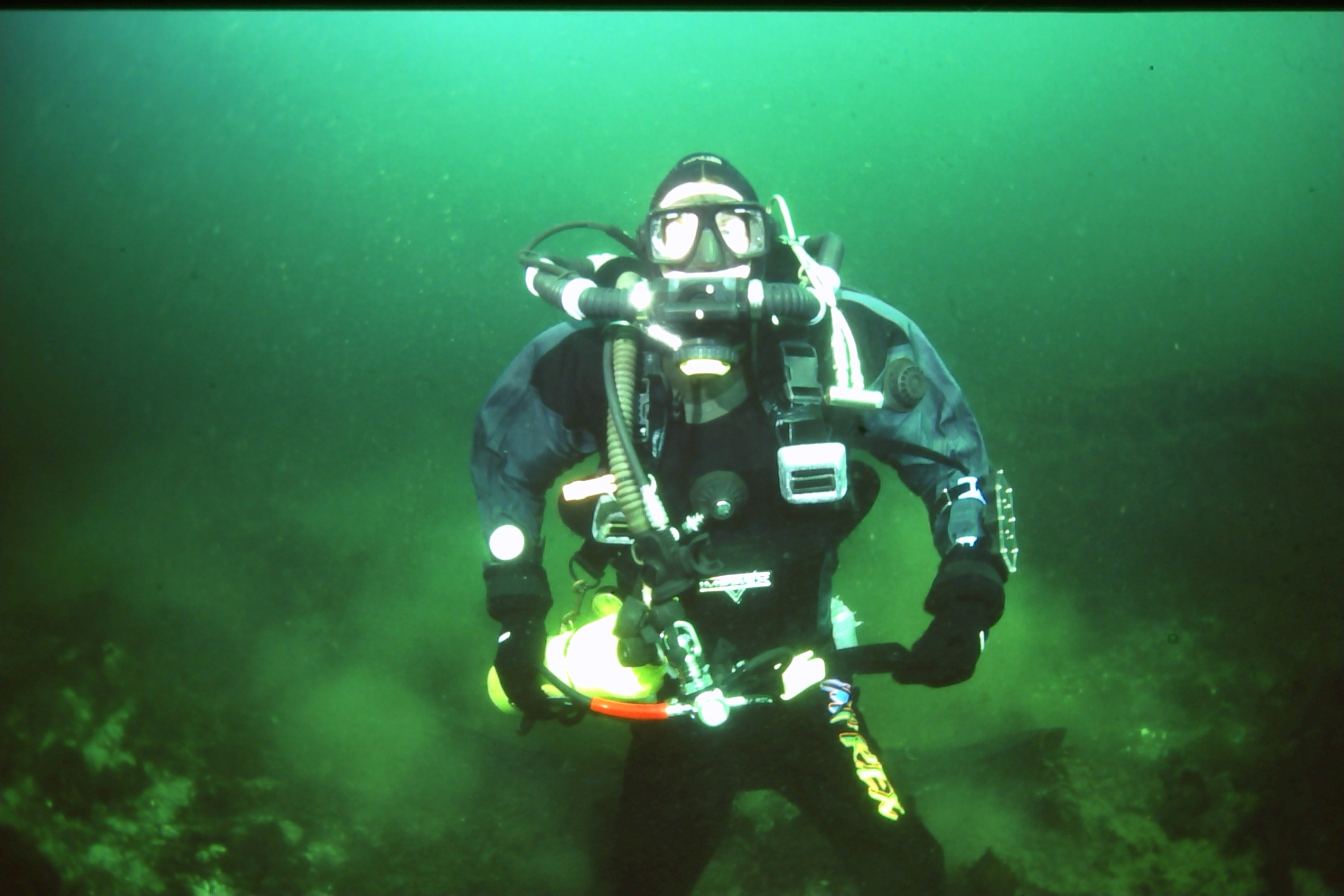
Daniel Reinders test-diving Gordon Smiths prototype rebreather

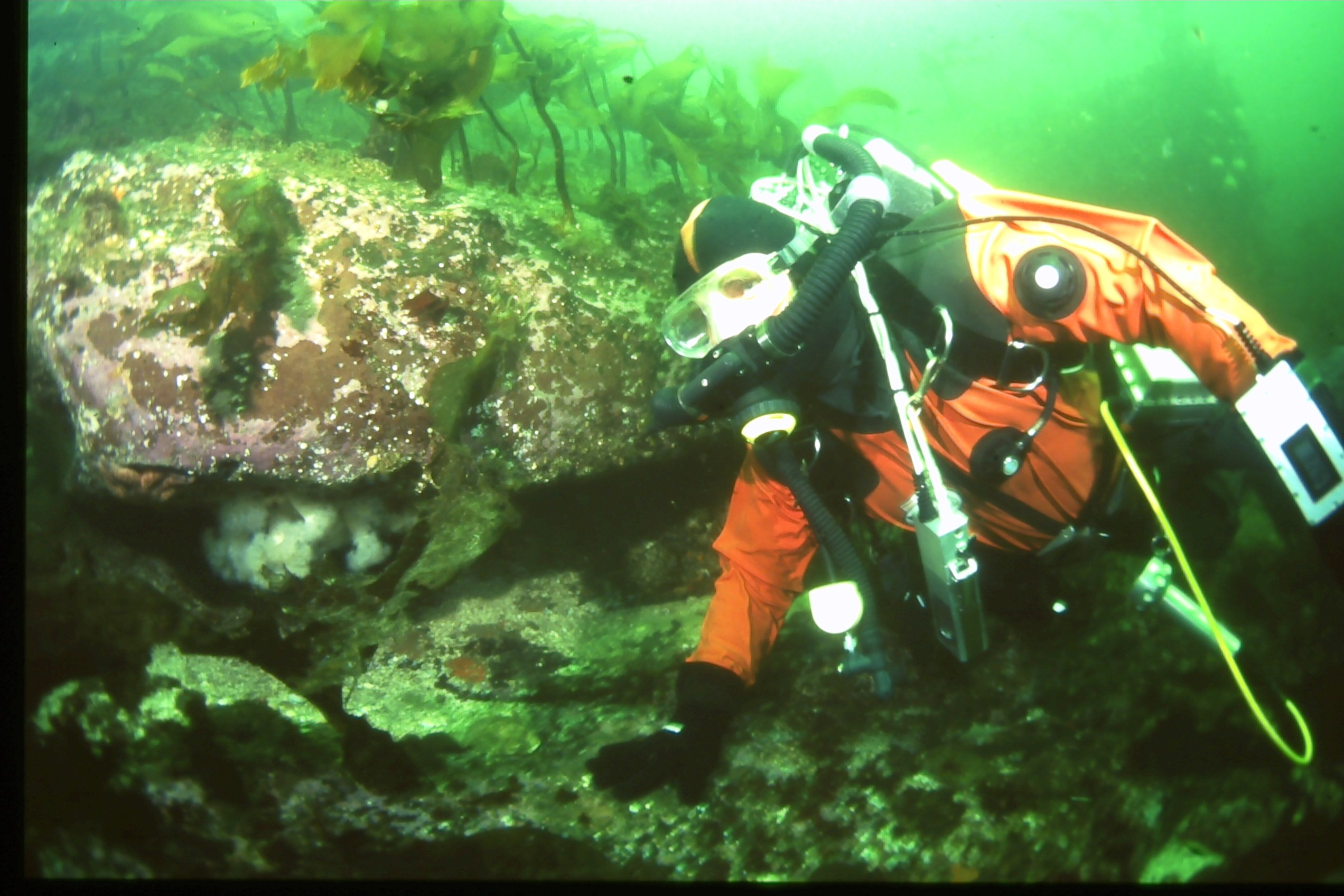
Gordon Smith with Semi-closed Circuit Prototype

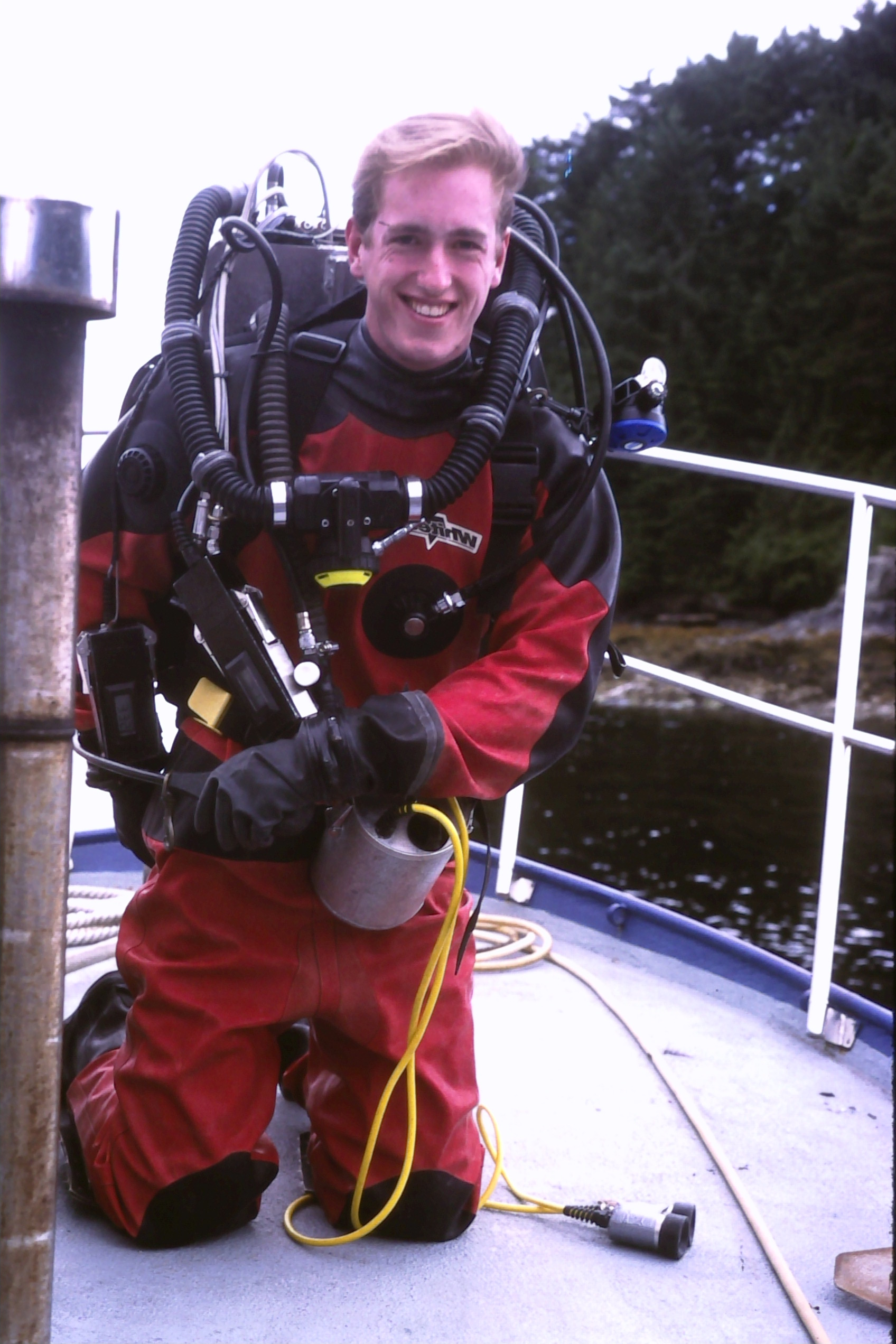
Daniel Reinders test-diving Gordon Smiths prototype rebreather

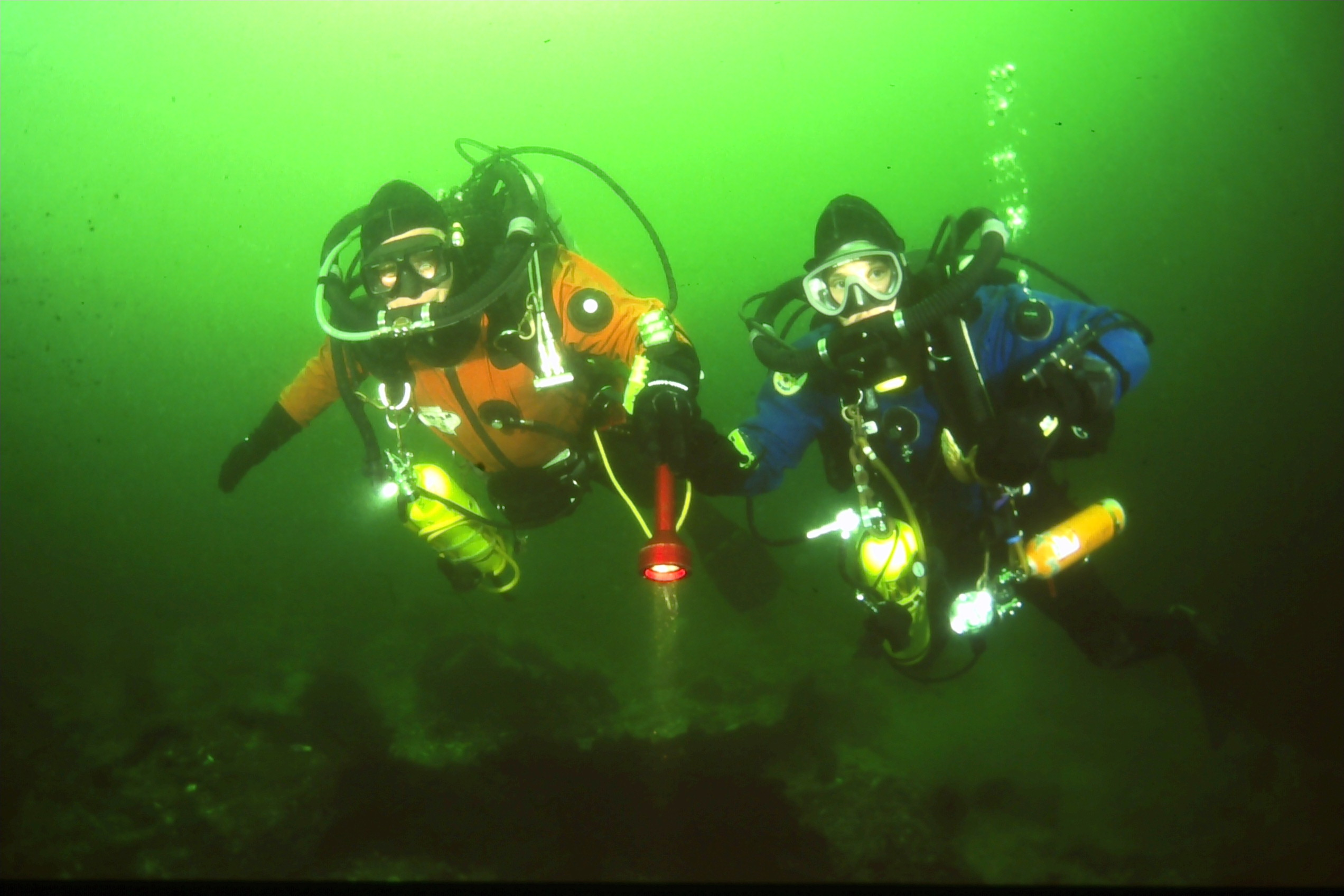
Gordon Smith with his prototype closed circuit rebreather

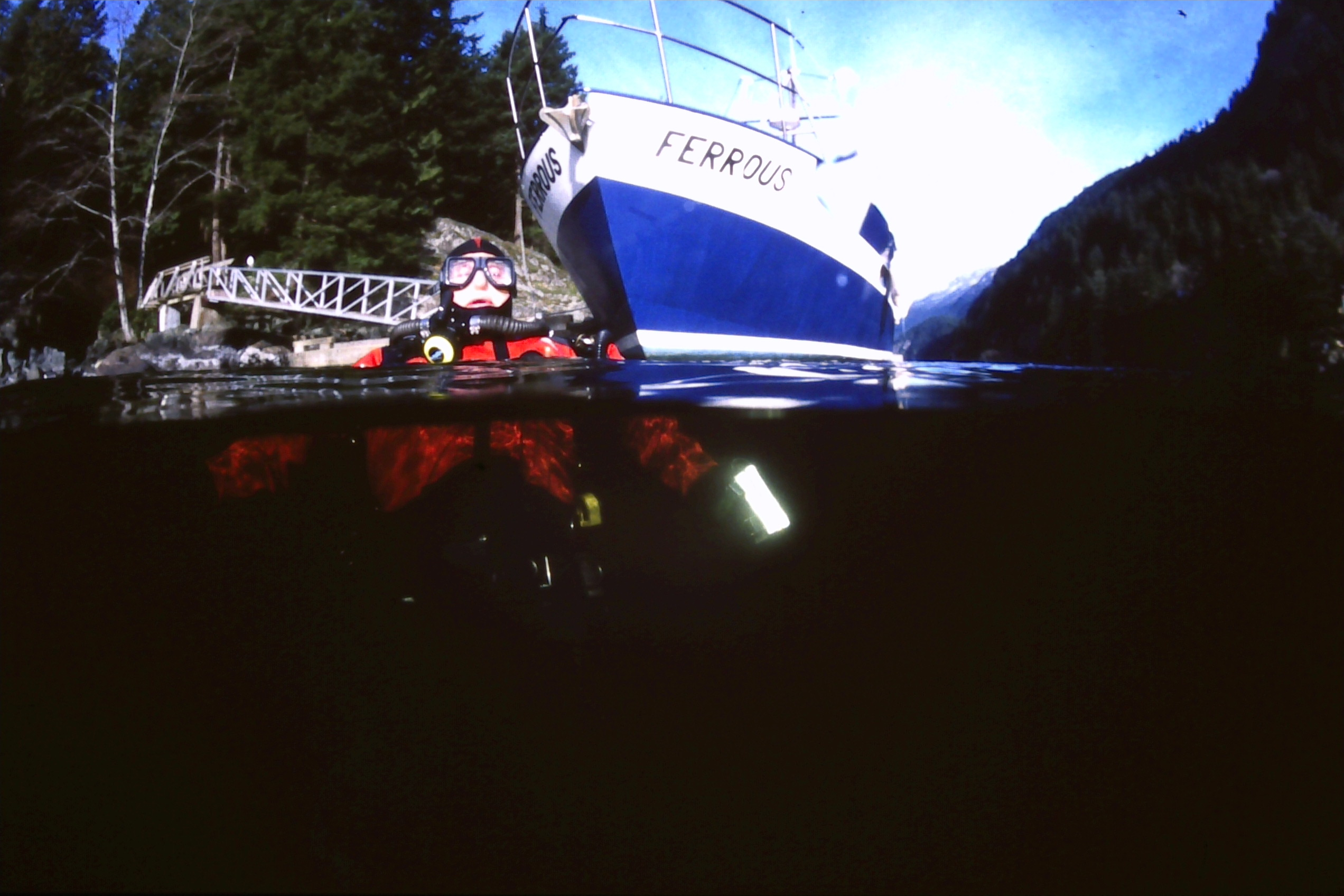
Gordon Smith with his prototype closed circuit rebreather and boat "Ferrous"

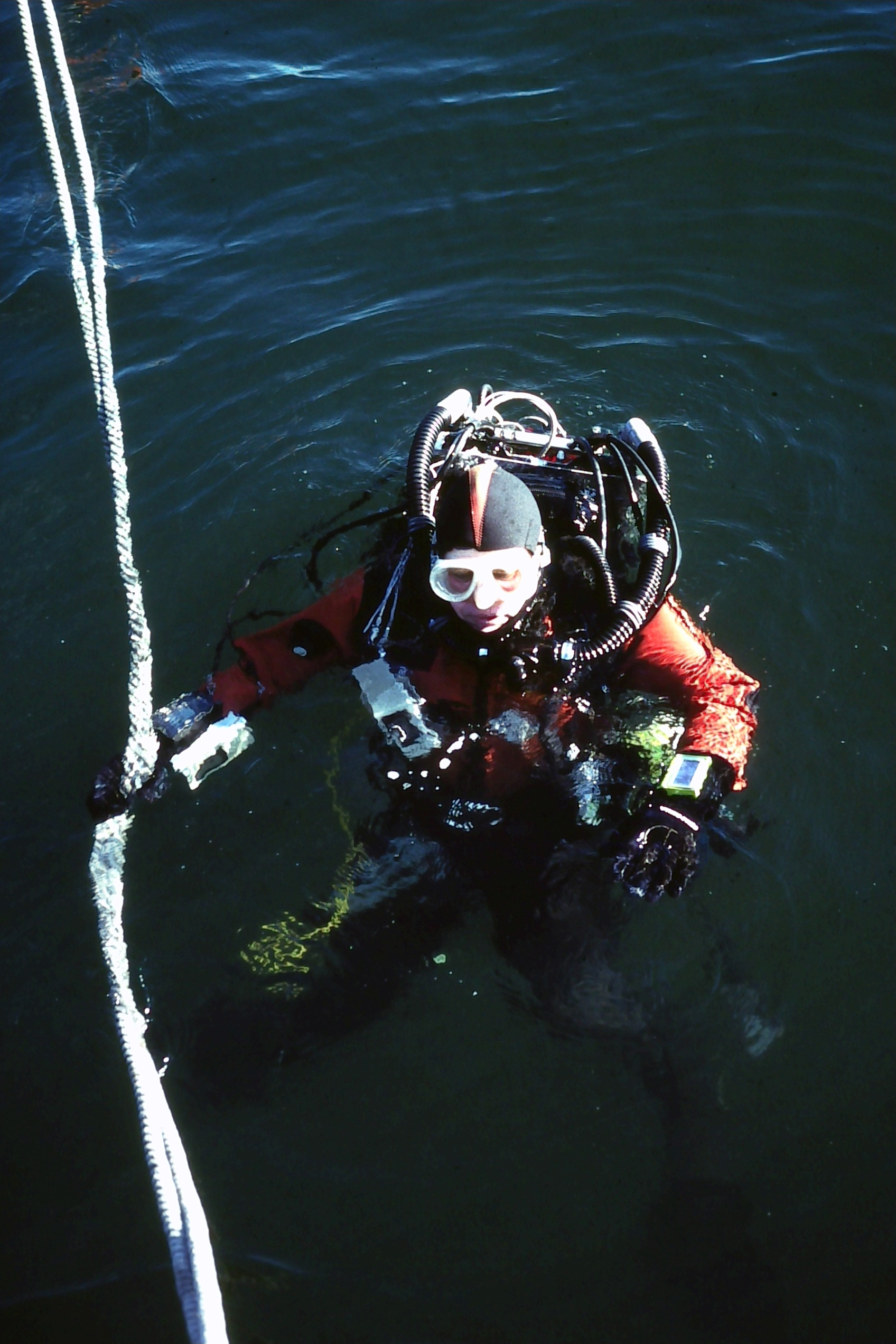
Gordon Smith with his prototype closed circuit rebreather

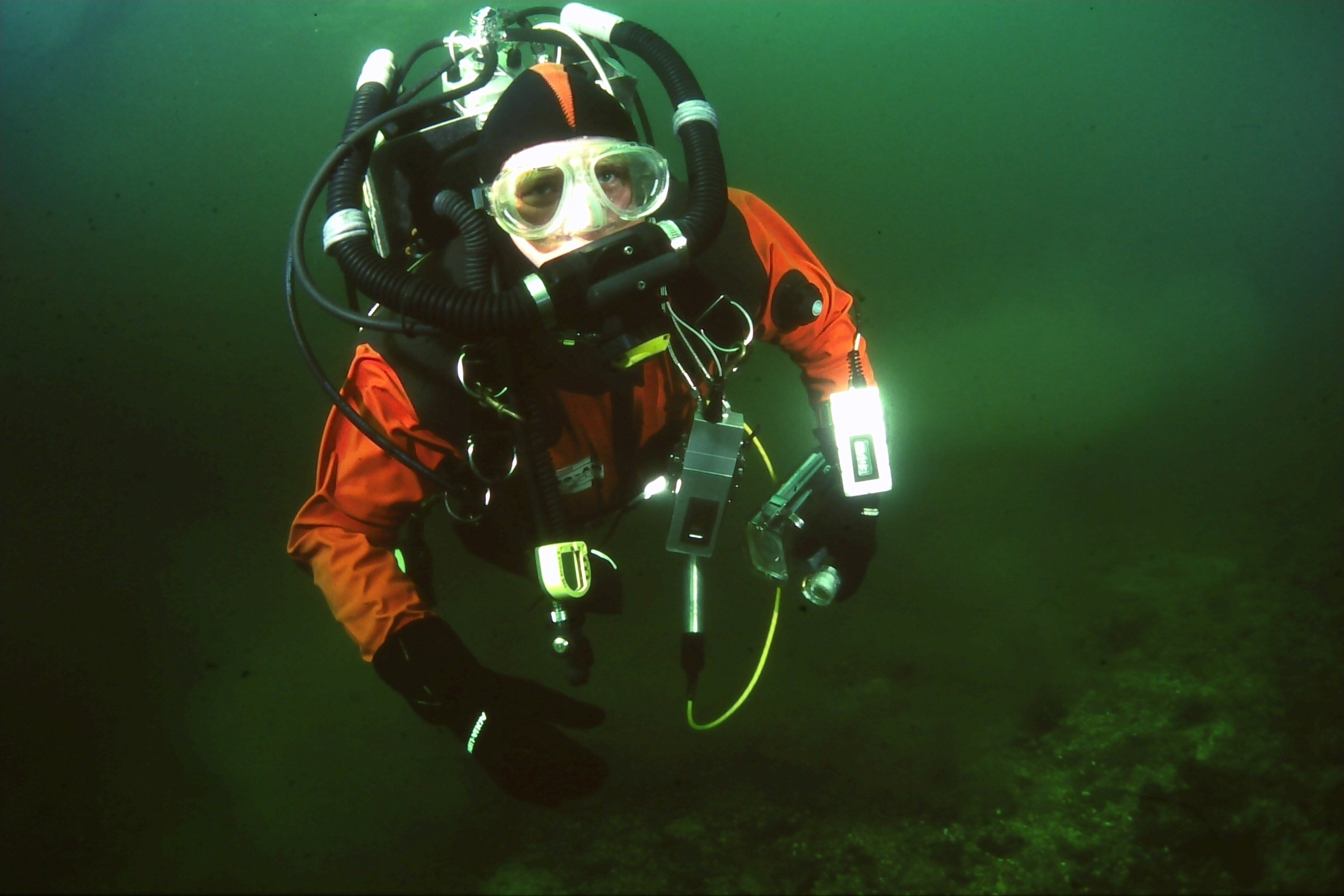
Gordon Smith with his prototype closed circuit rebreather

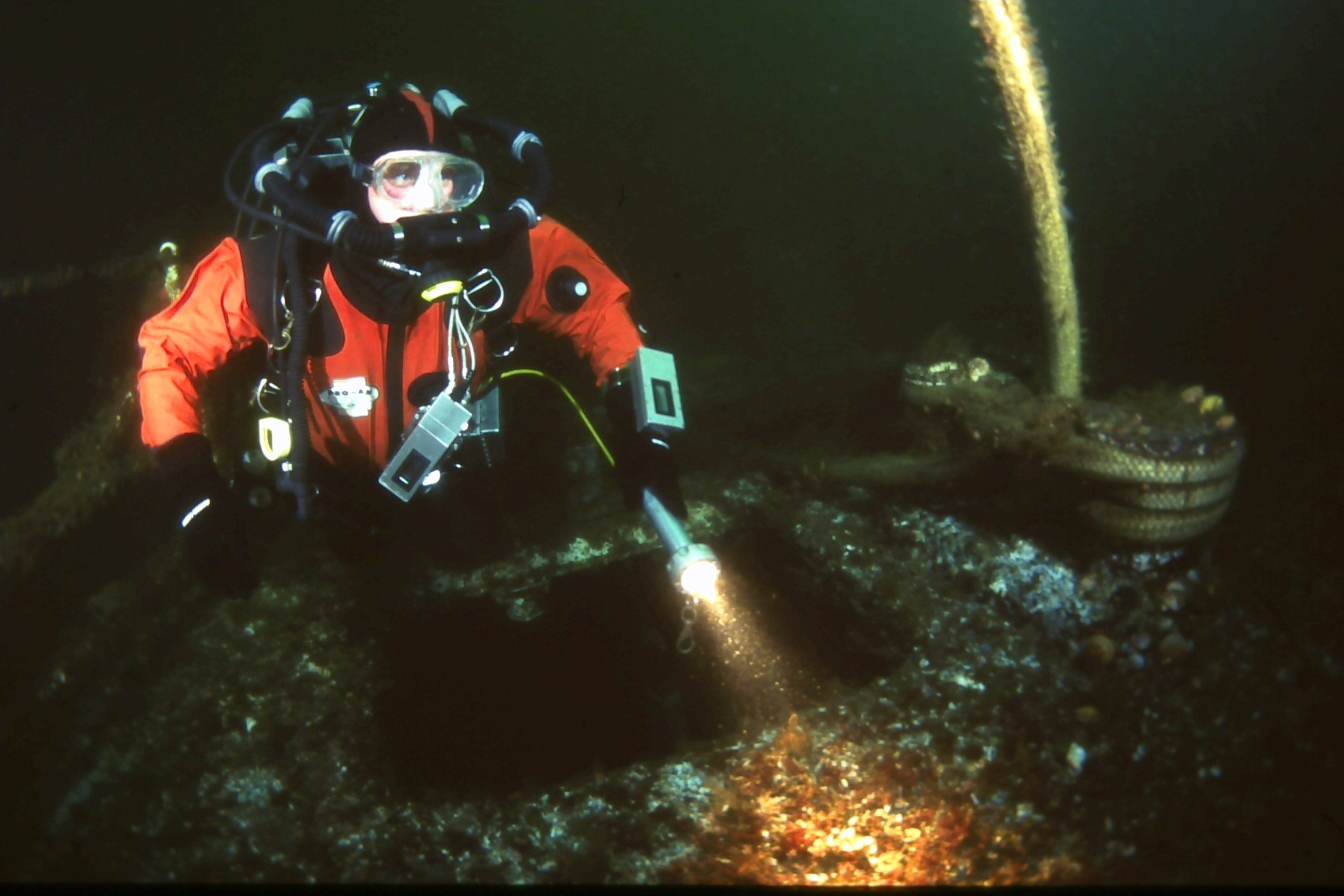
Gordon Smith with his prototype closed circuit rebreather

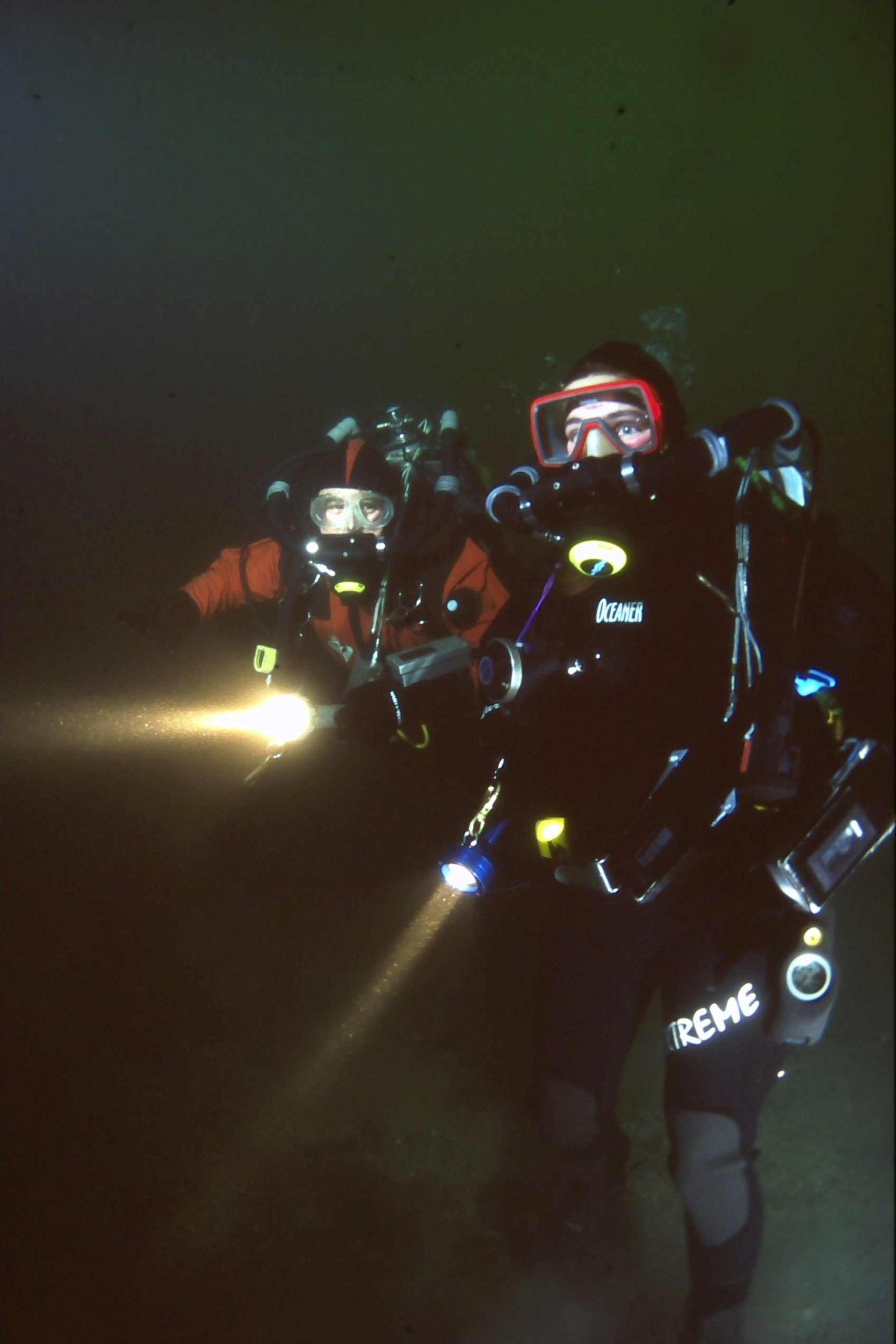
Gordon Smith and Natasha Dickinson with his prototype rebreathers

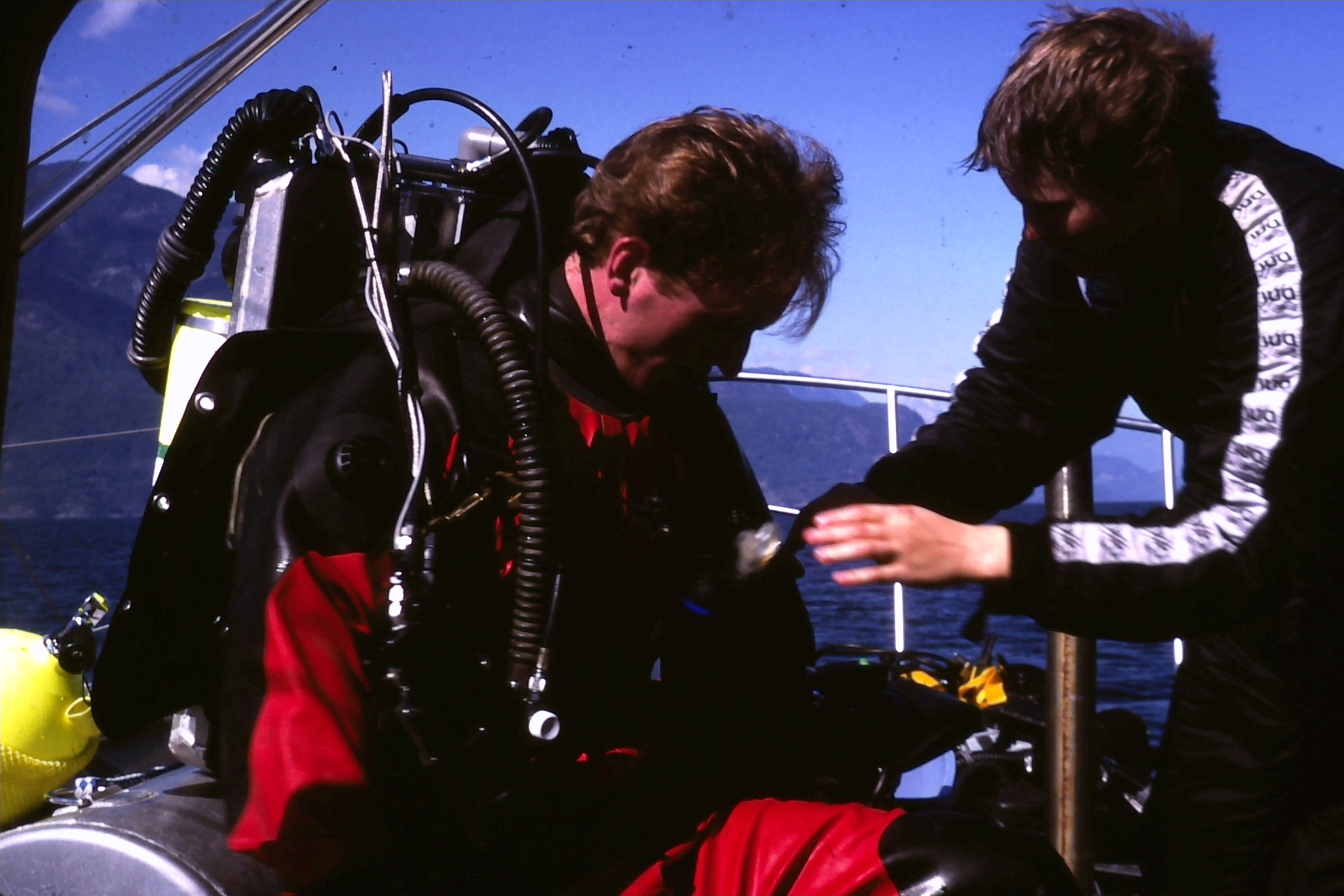
Kiss rebreather testing with Daniel Reinders as diver.

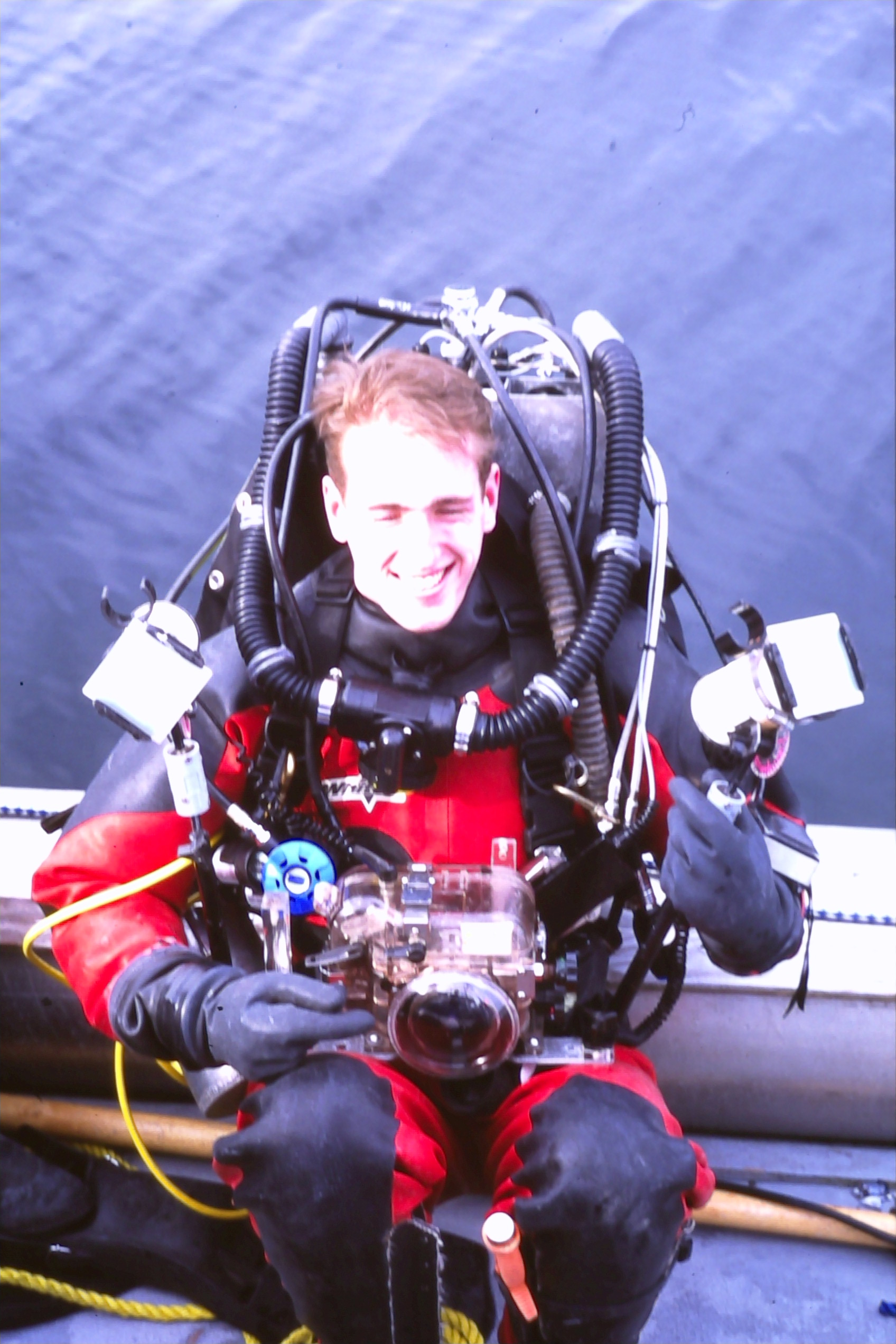
Kiss rebreather testing with Daniel Reinders as diver.

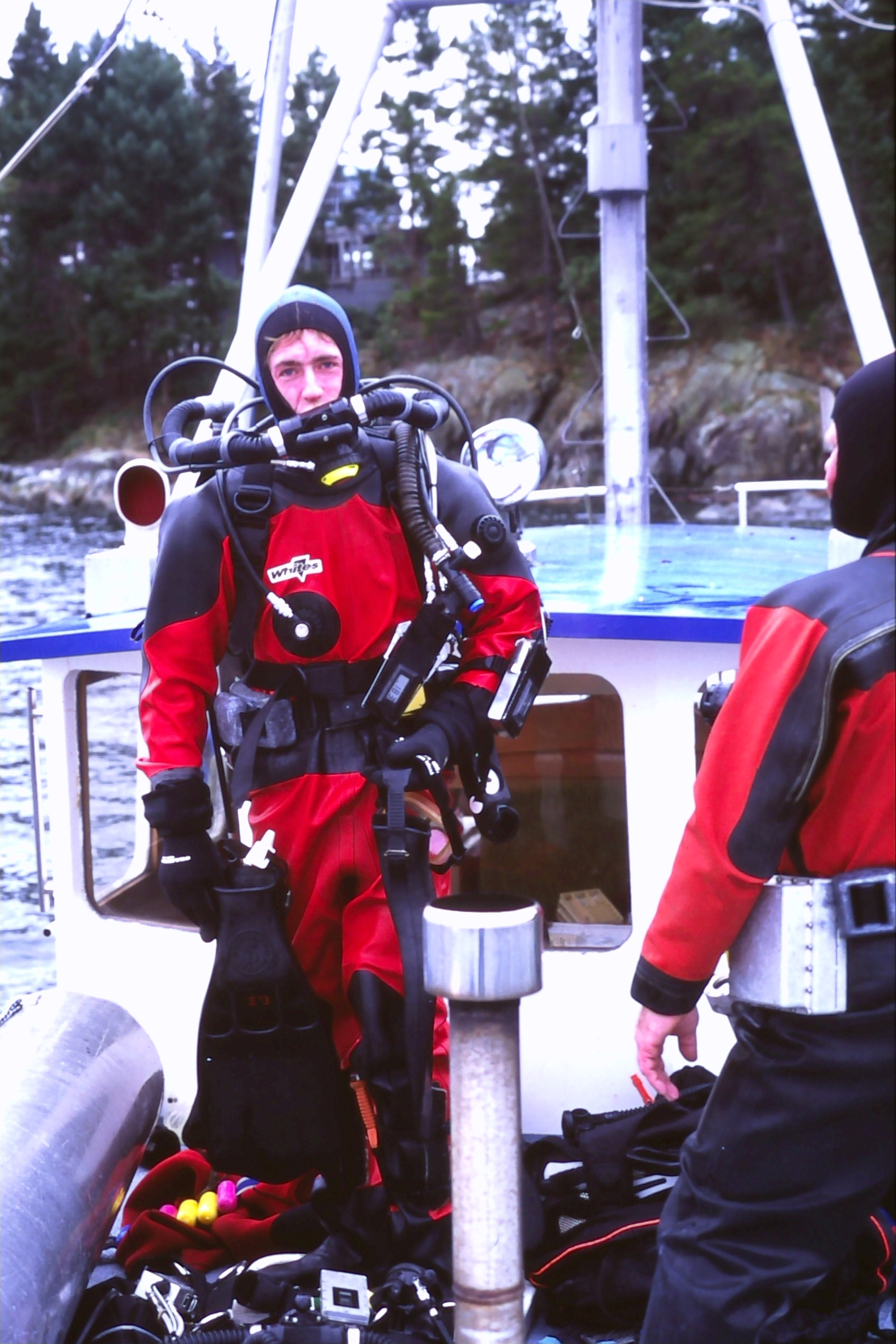
Kiss rebreather testing with Daniel Reinders as diver, pre-breathing the unit prior to dive.

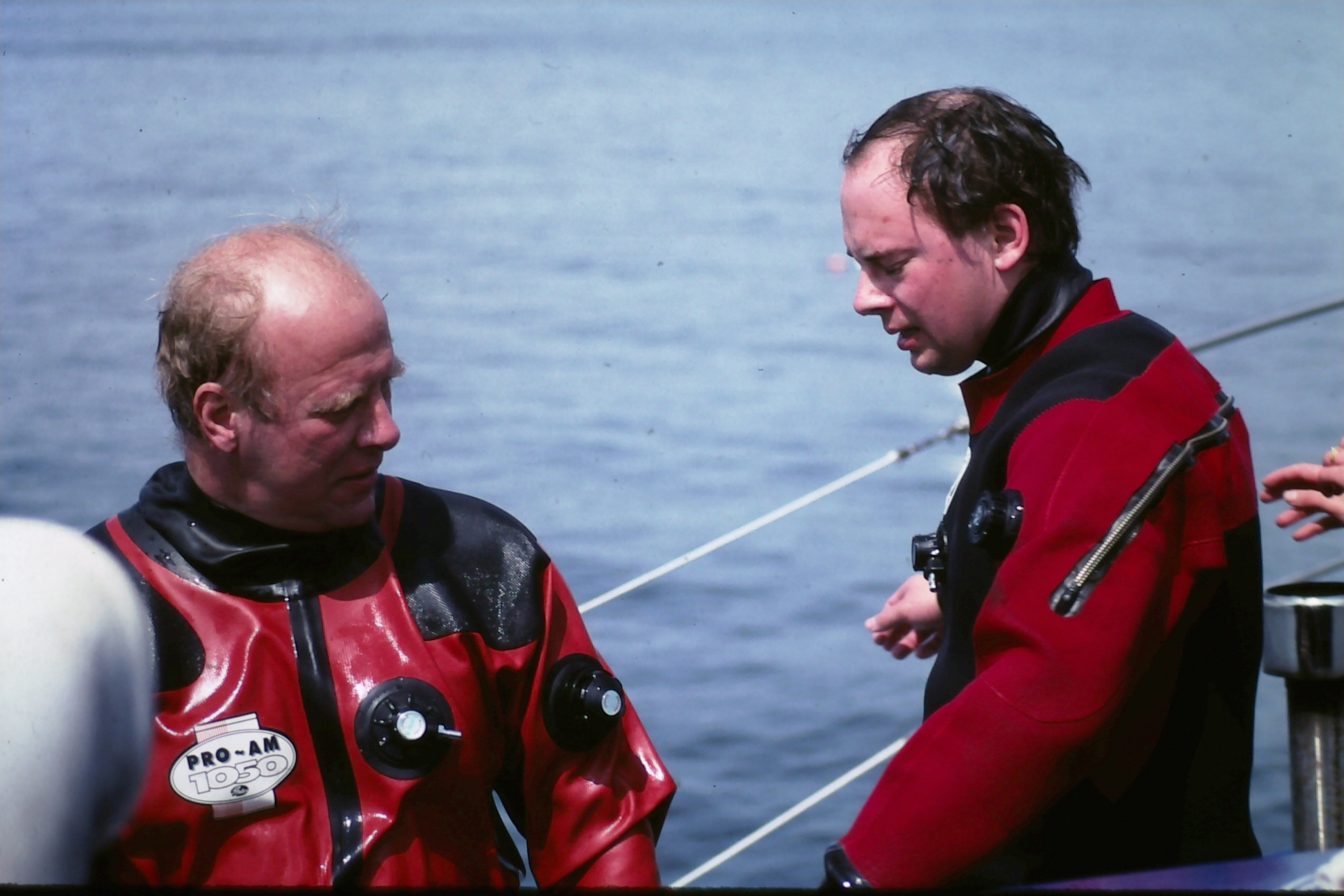
Gordon Smith, inventor and diver, protected by the orange dry-suit.

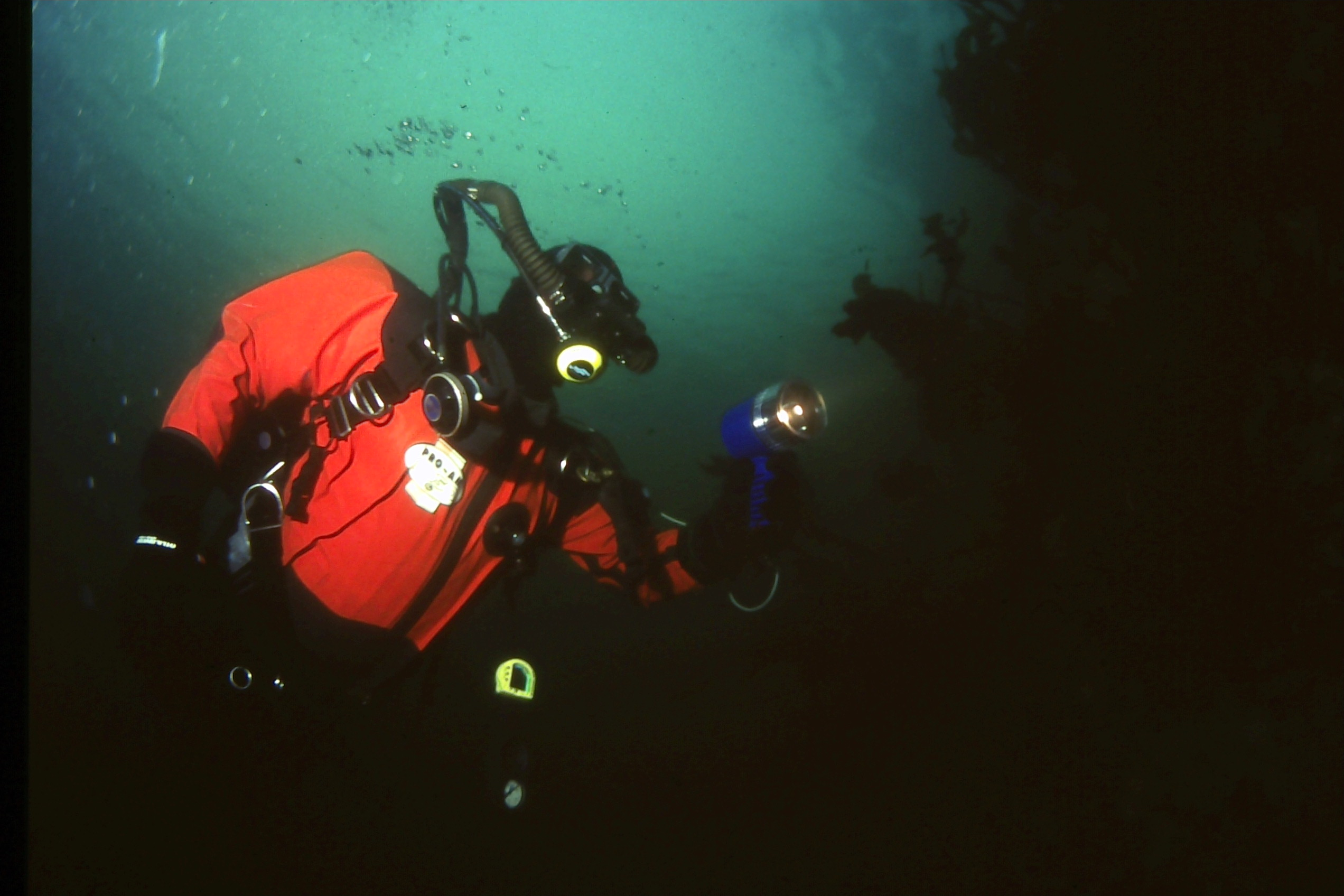
Kiss rebreather testing by Gordon Smith.

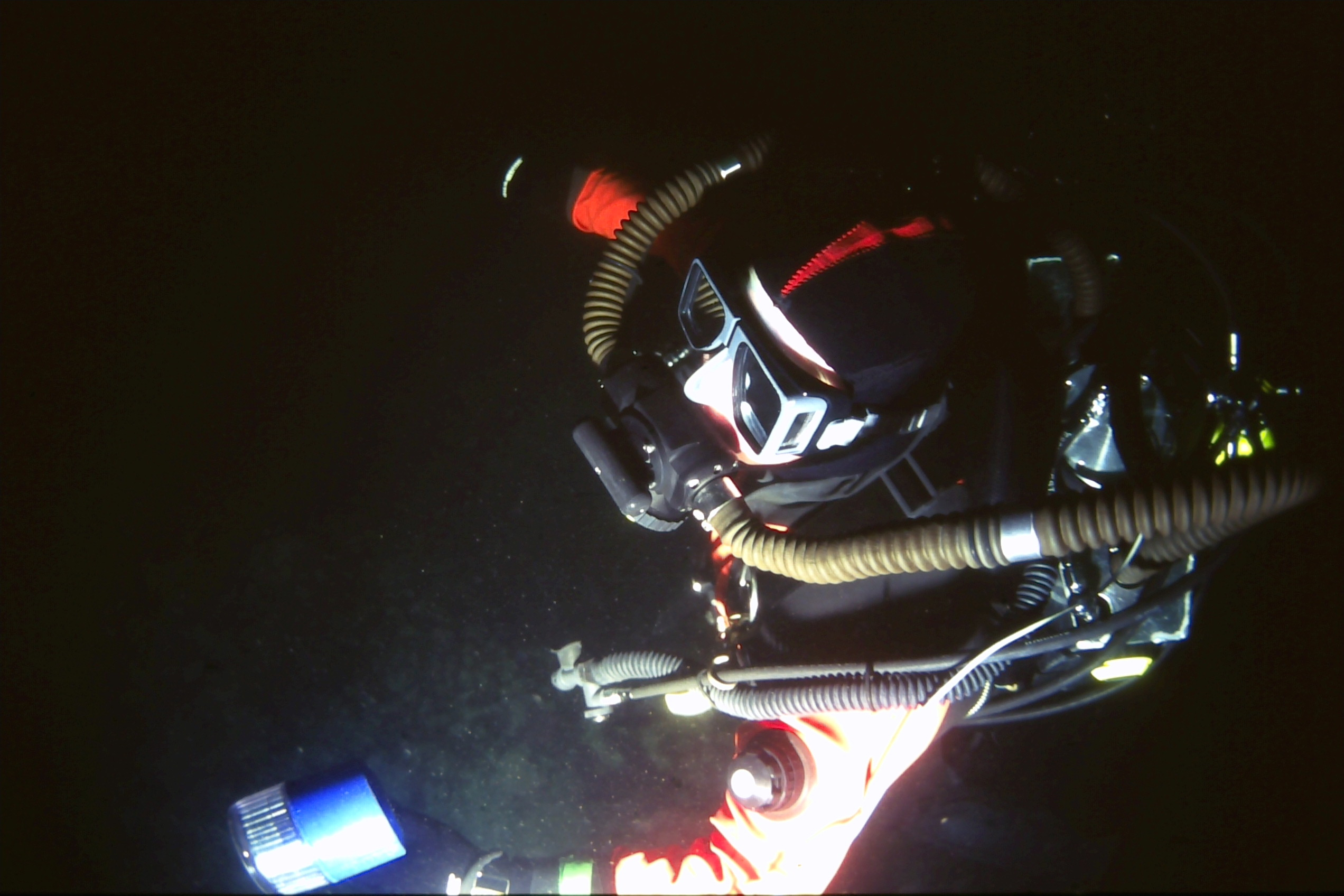
Kiss rebreather testing of the prototype semi-closed unit.

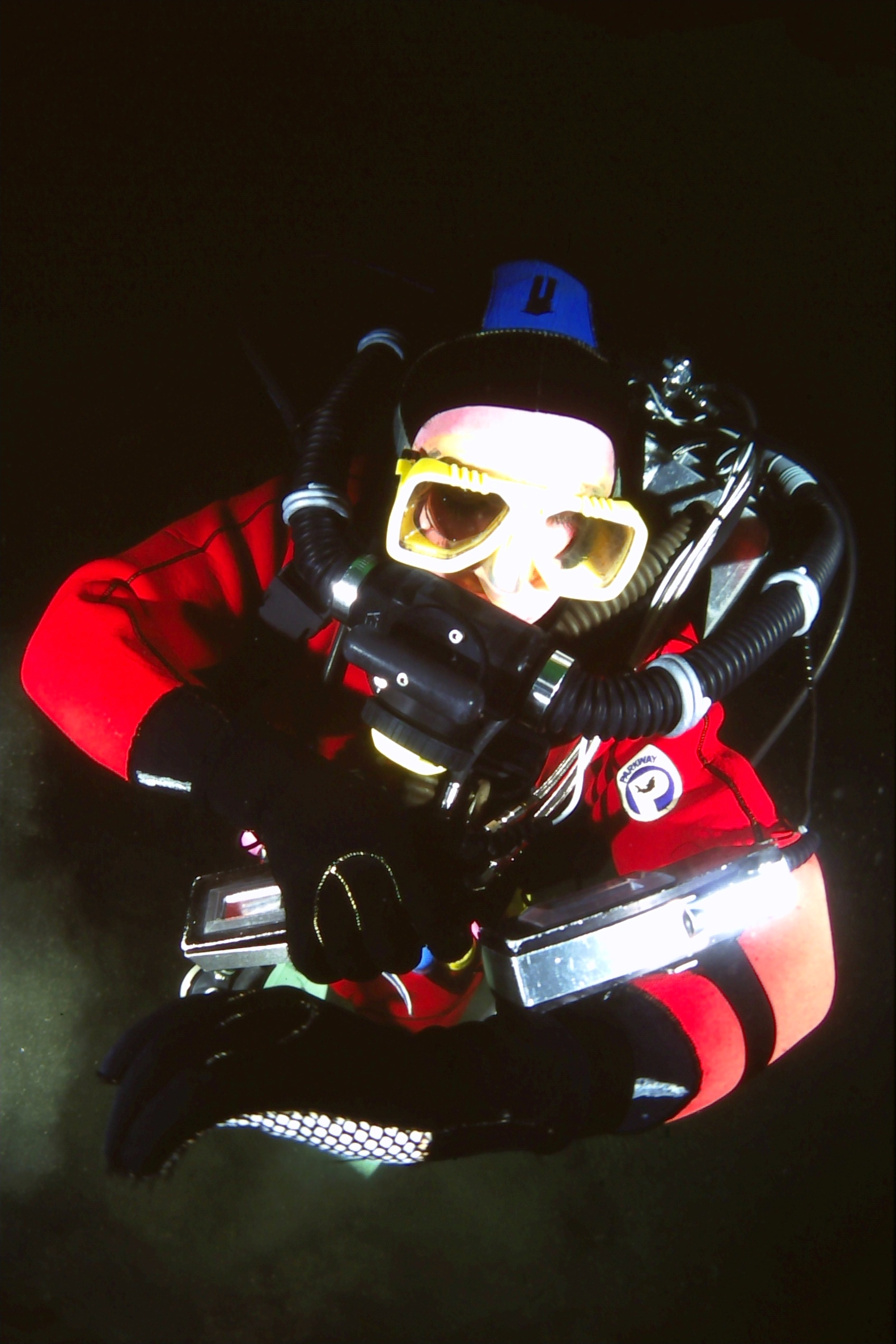
Kiss rebreather testing by diver Daniel Mayes.

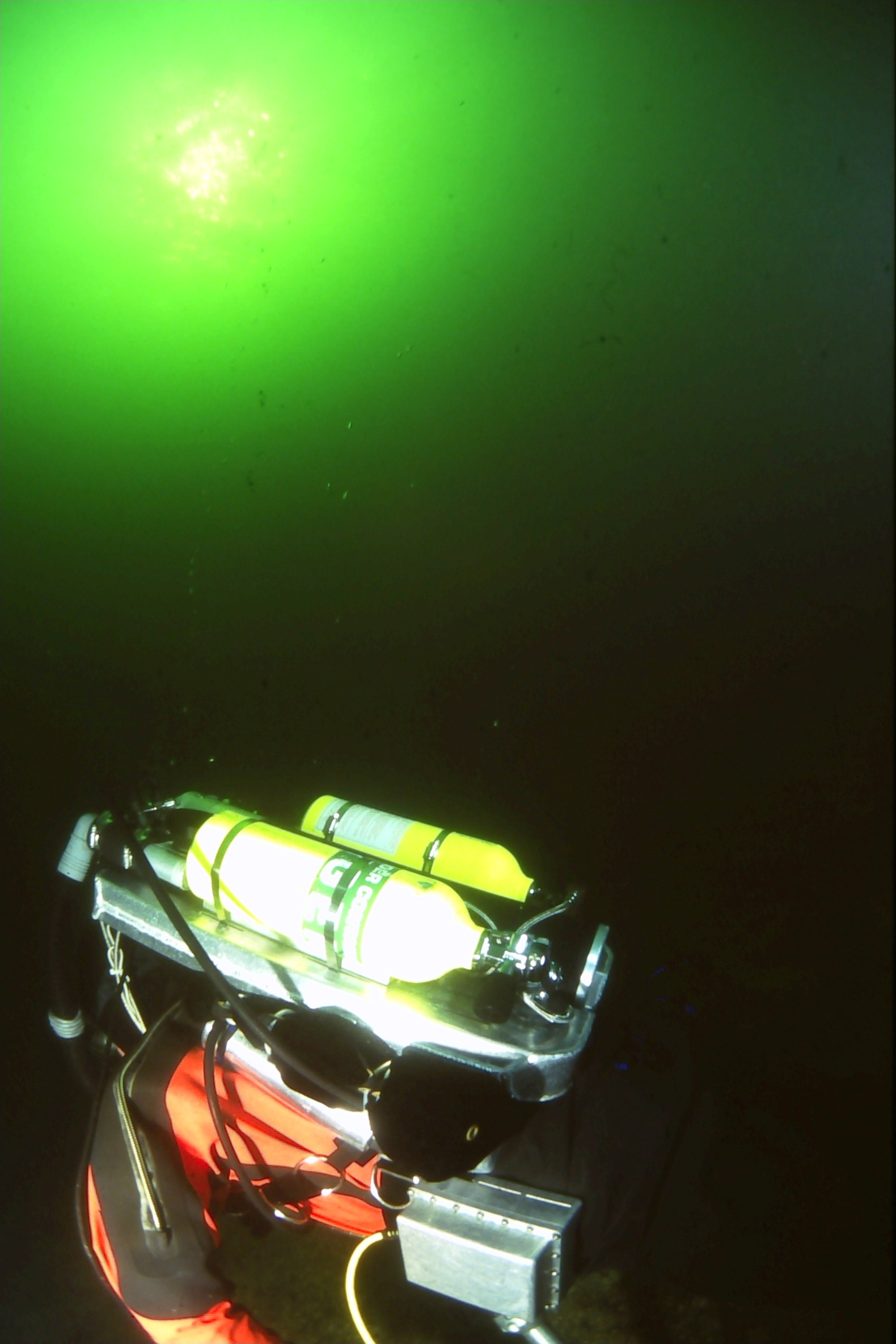
Kiss rebreather testing of the fully closed unit.

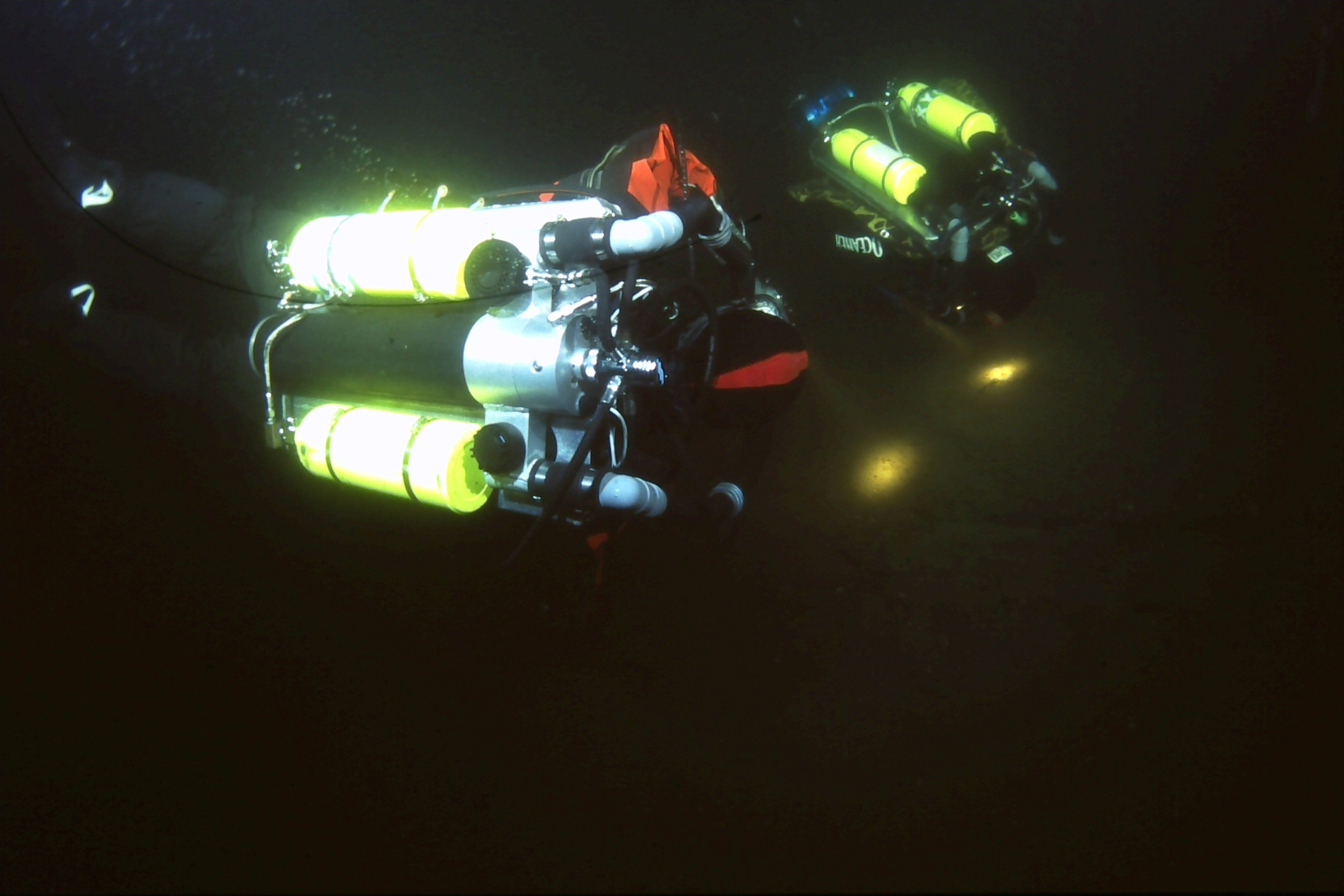
Kiss rebreather testing of the fully closed unit.

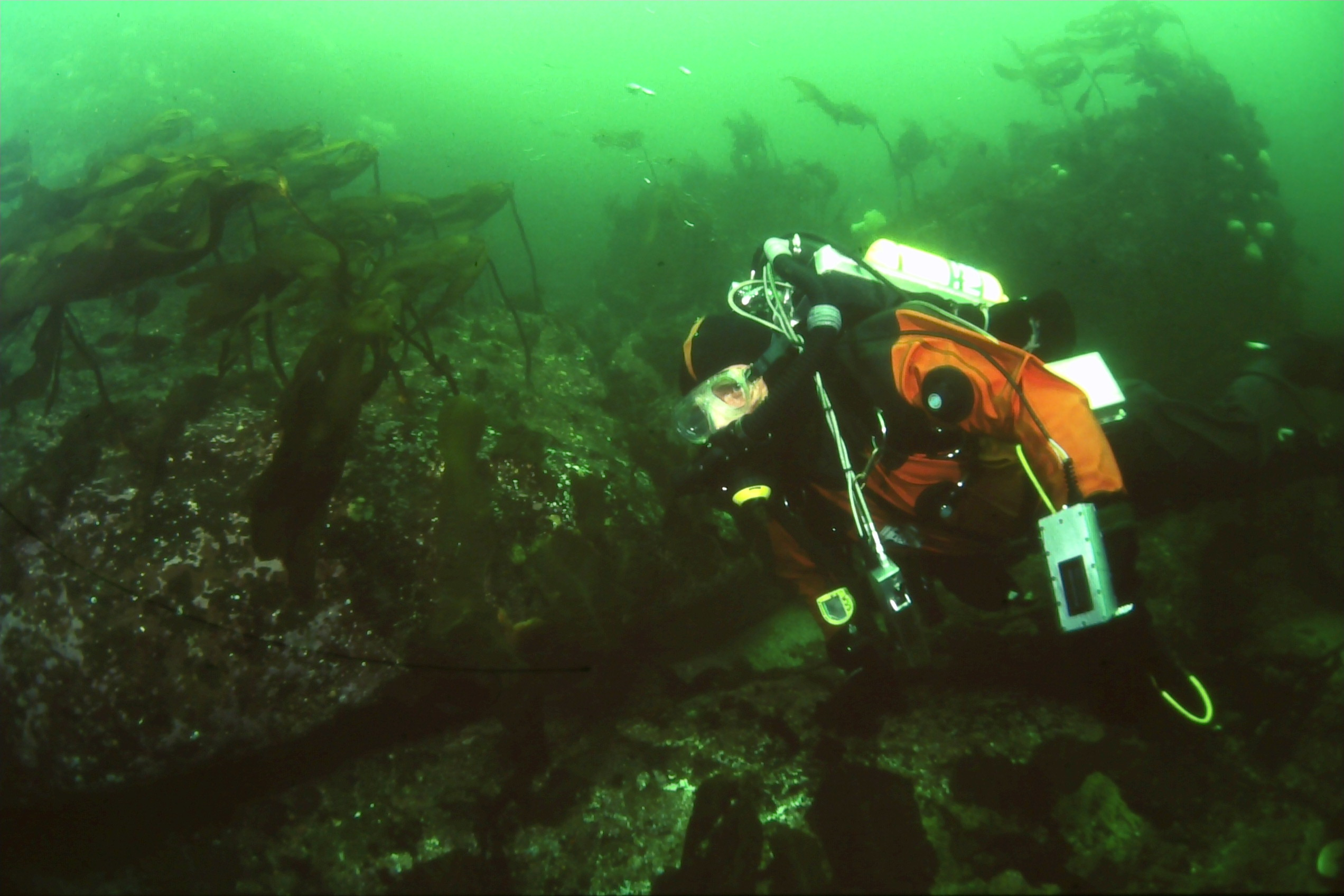
Kiss rebreather testing of the fully closed unit.

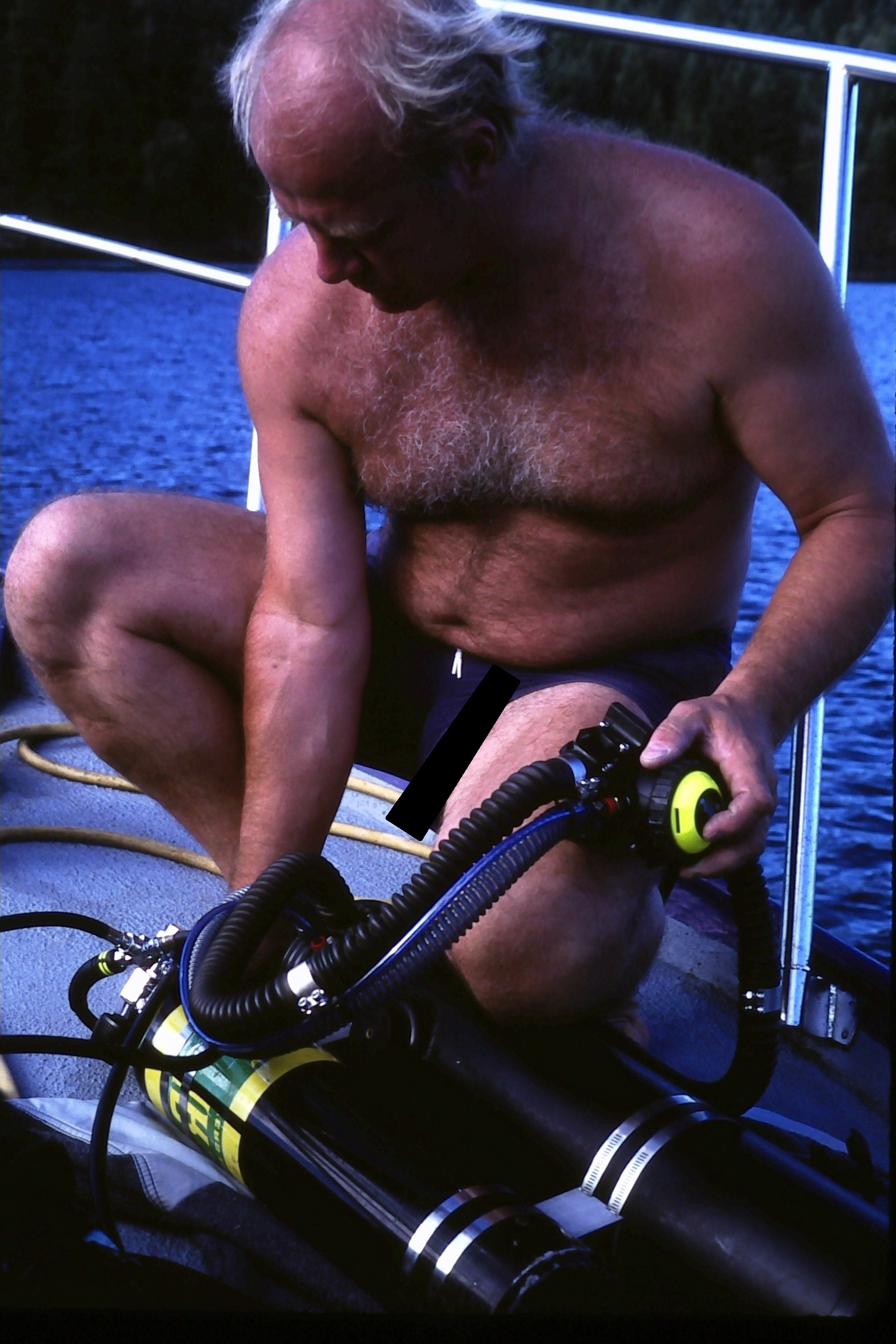
Test diving the original piston-based semi-closed unit. Picture posted with black bar per his in-life request for eventual publication, reflecting his special sense of humor.

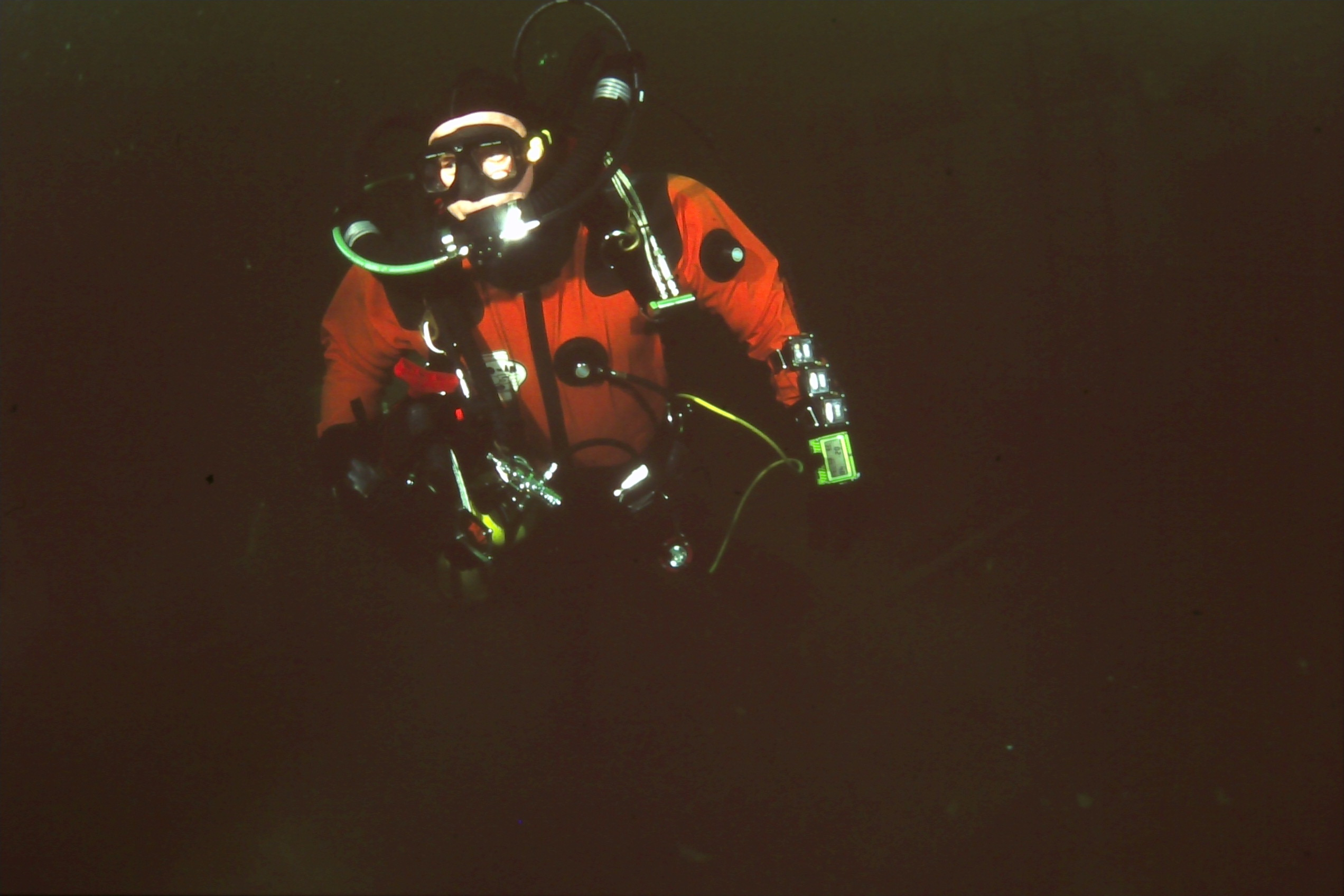
Kiss rebreather testing by Gordon Smith, with the miniaturized triple sensor displays.

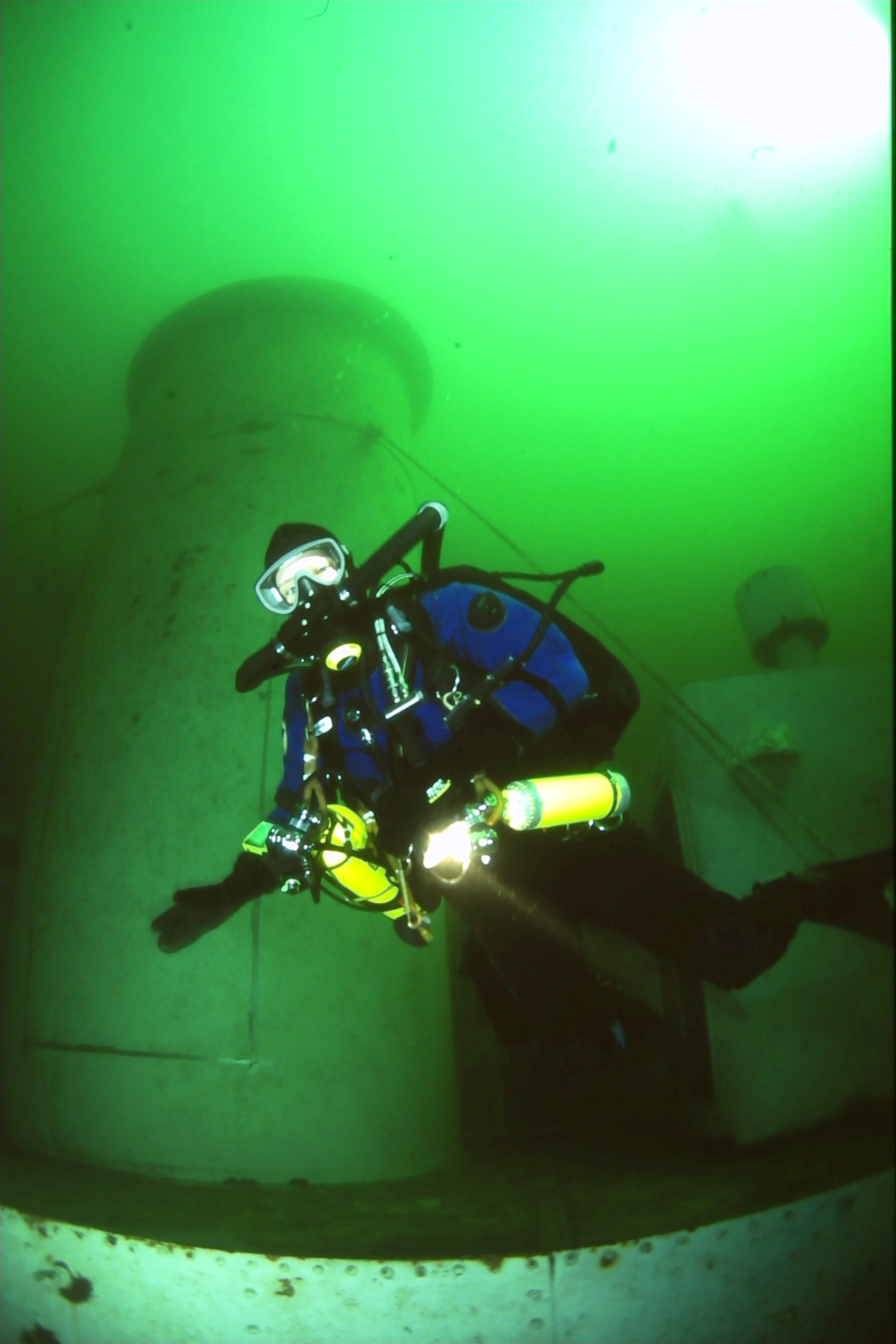
Kiss rebreather testing on HMCS Saskatchewan.

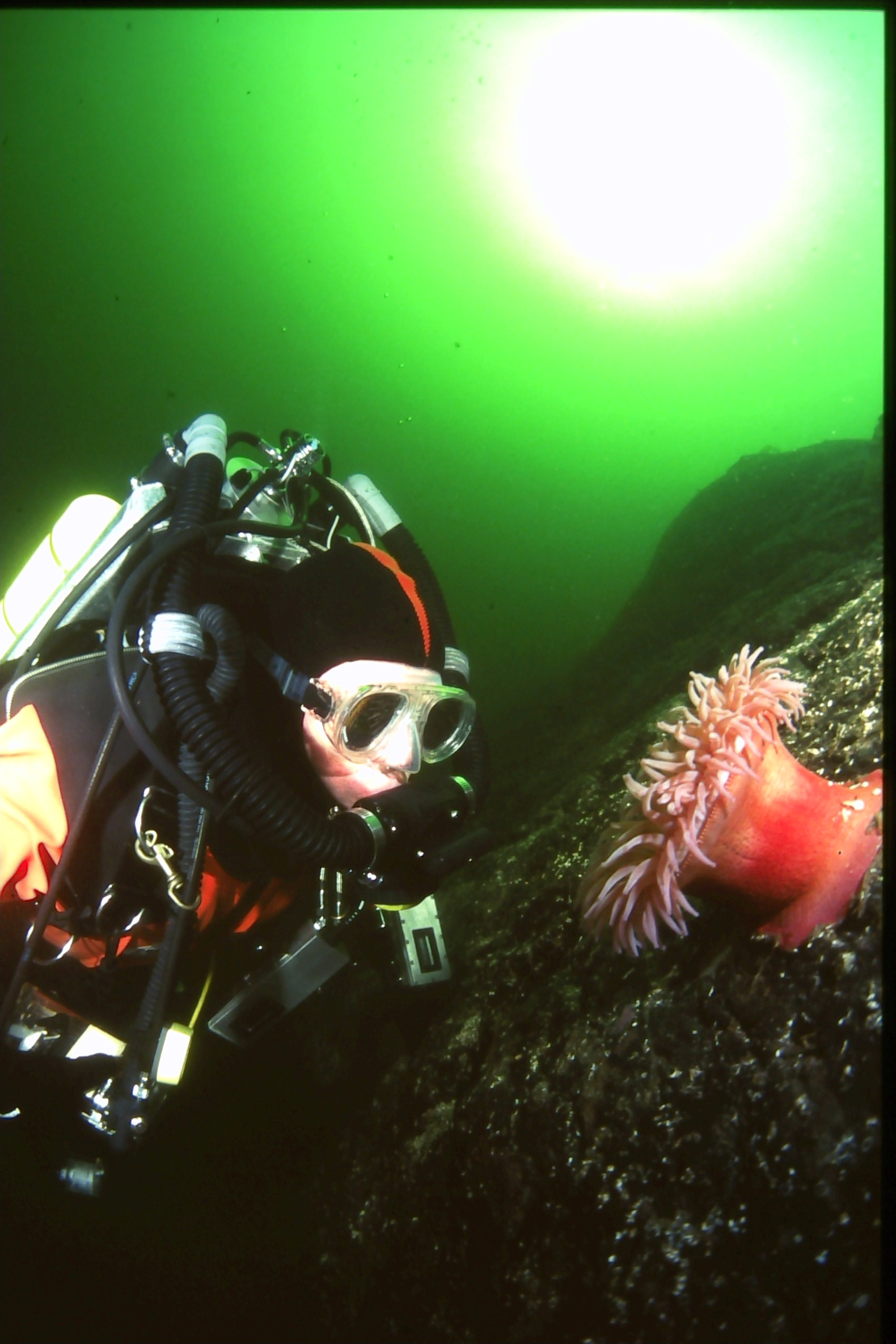
Kiss rebreather testing of the 2-block fully closed system.

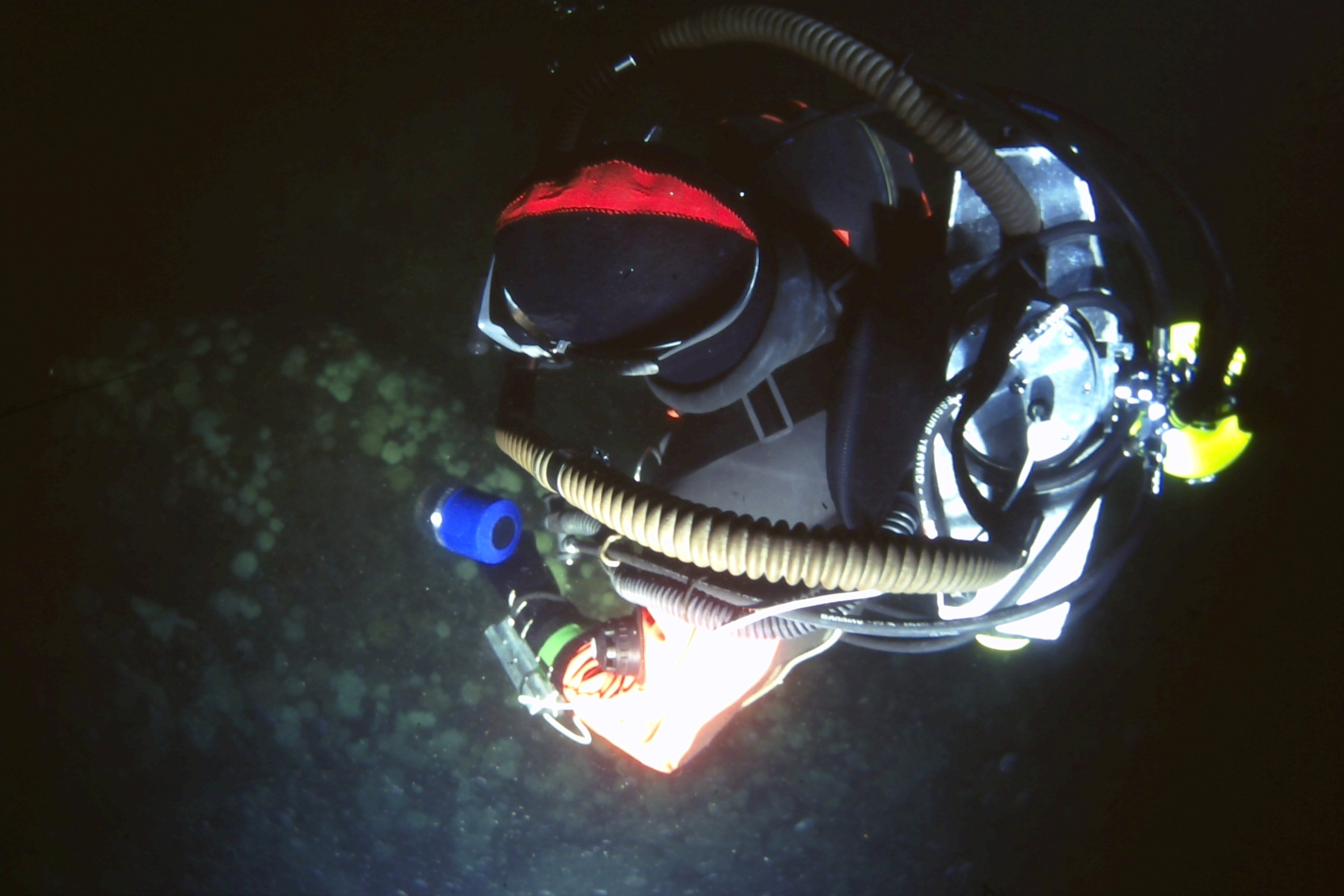
Kiss rebreather testing of the prototype semi-closed system.

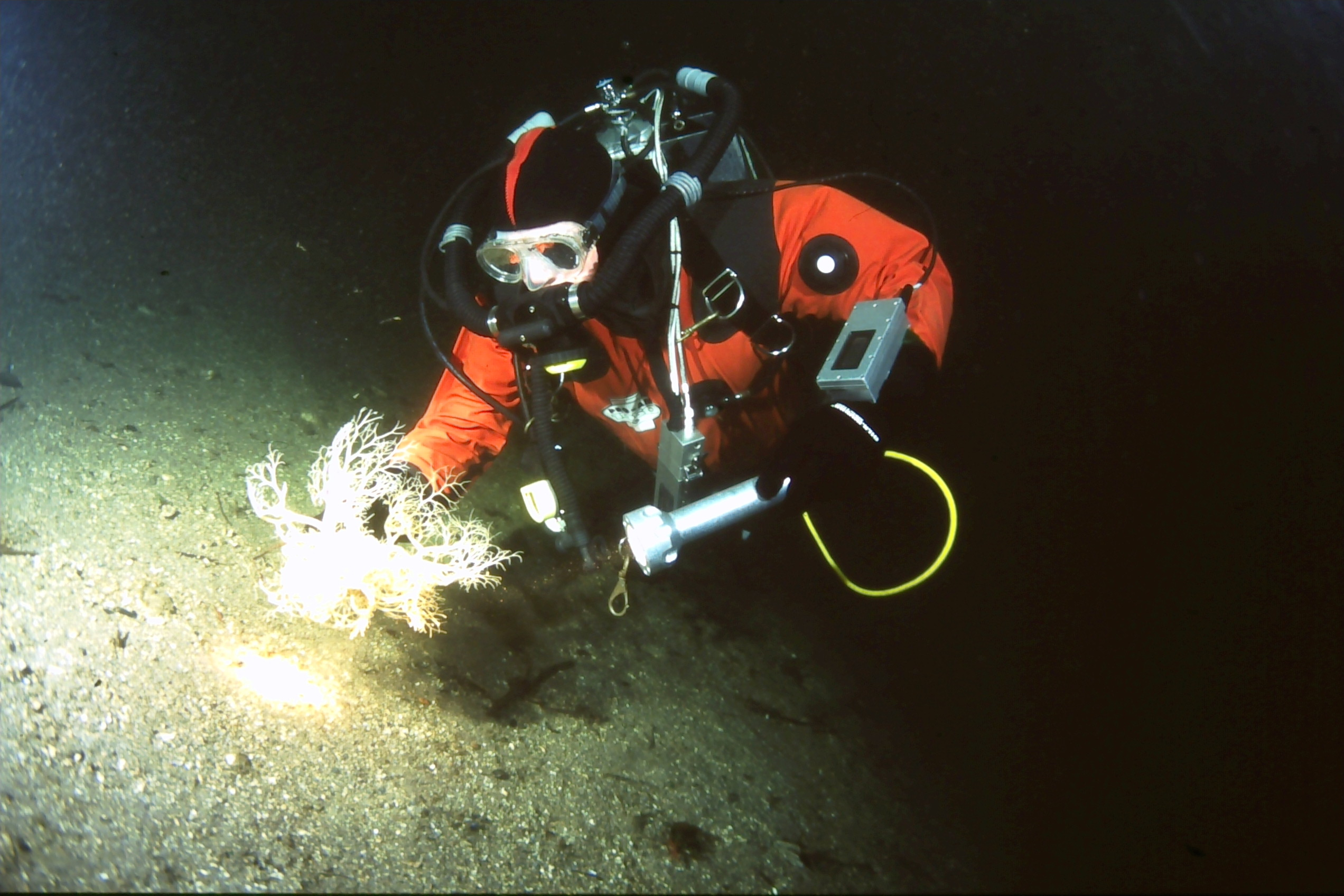
Kiss rebreather testing of the fully closed system with a basket star.

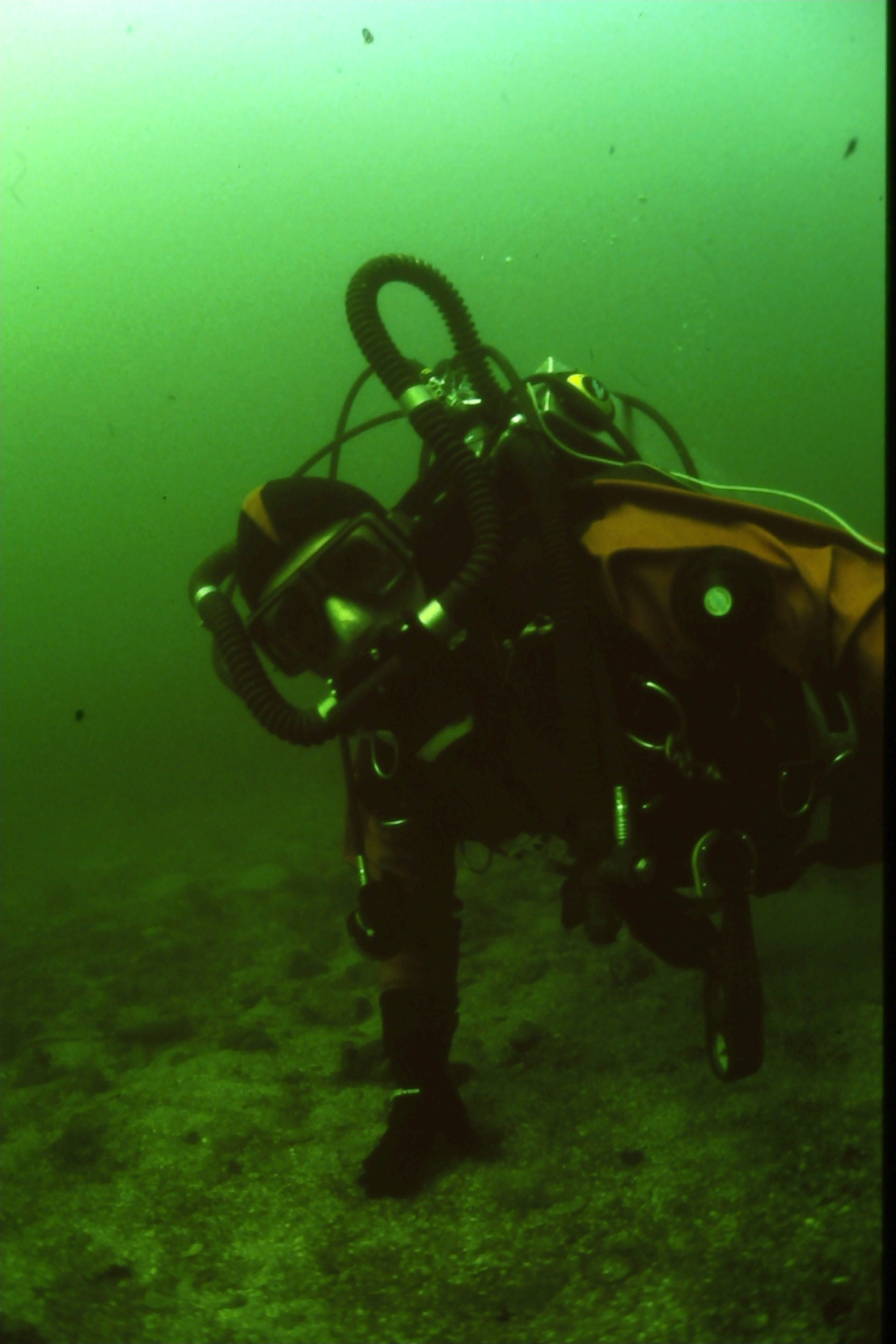
Kiss rebreather testing of the original semi-closed system.

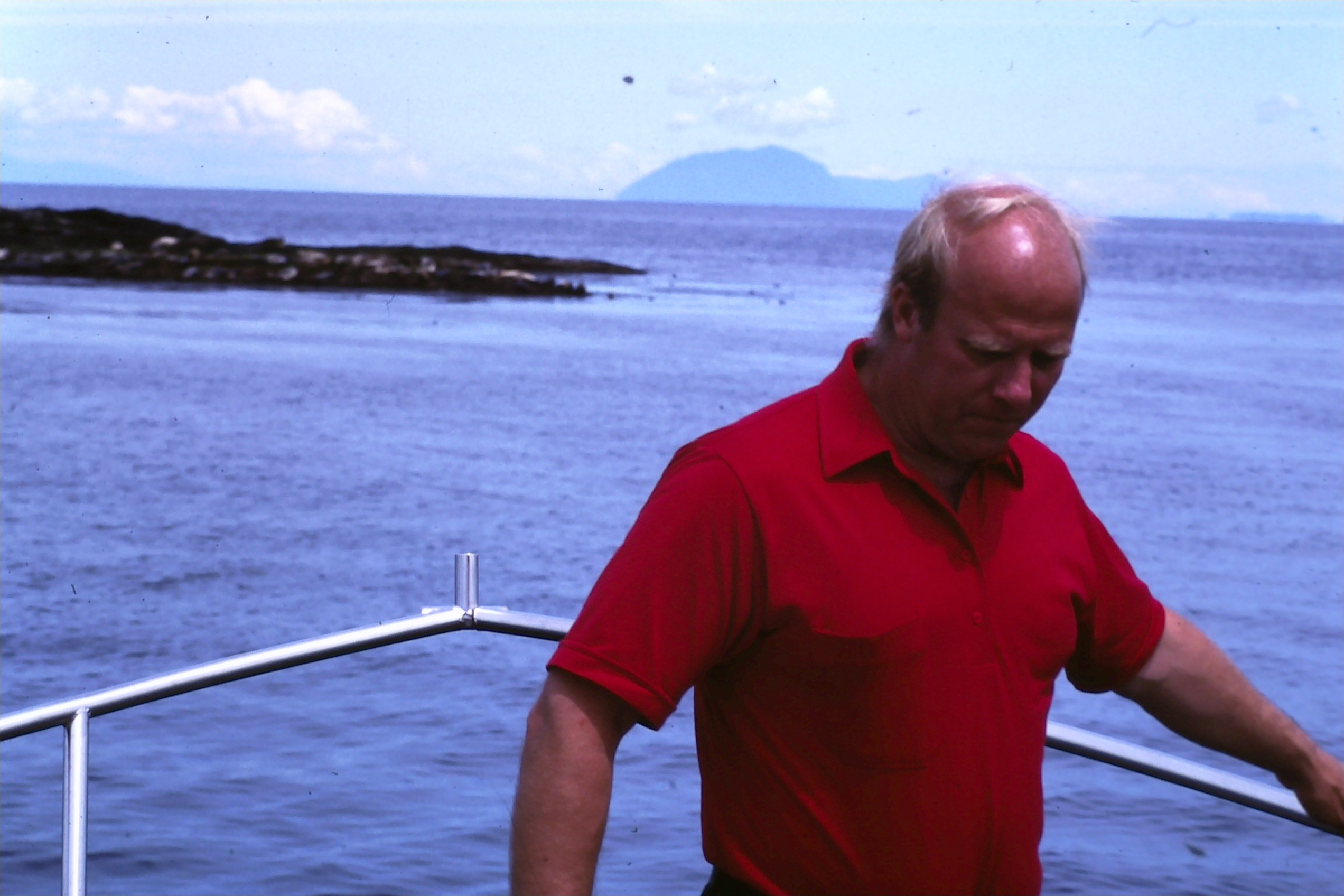
Gordon Smith, inventor and diver on his boat "Ferrous".

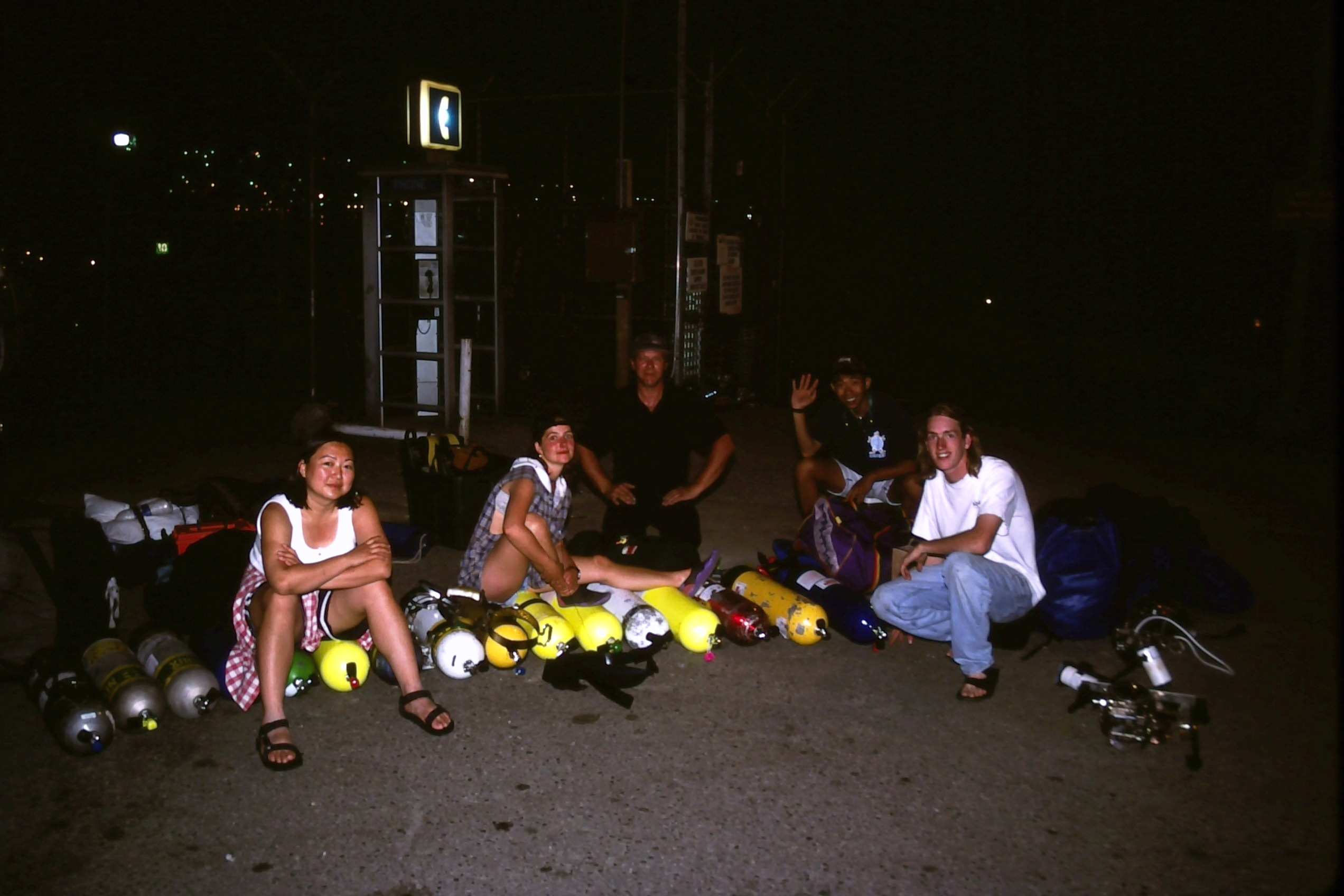
Gordon Smith, along with friends Natasha Dickinson and Daniel Reinders in 1996. The number of scuba cylinders involved in each trip was a significant part of his motivation to switch to rebreathers for dive trips.

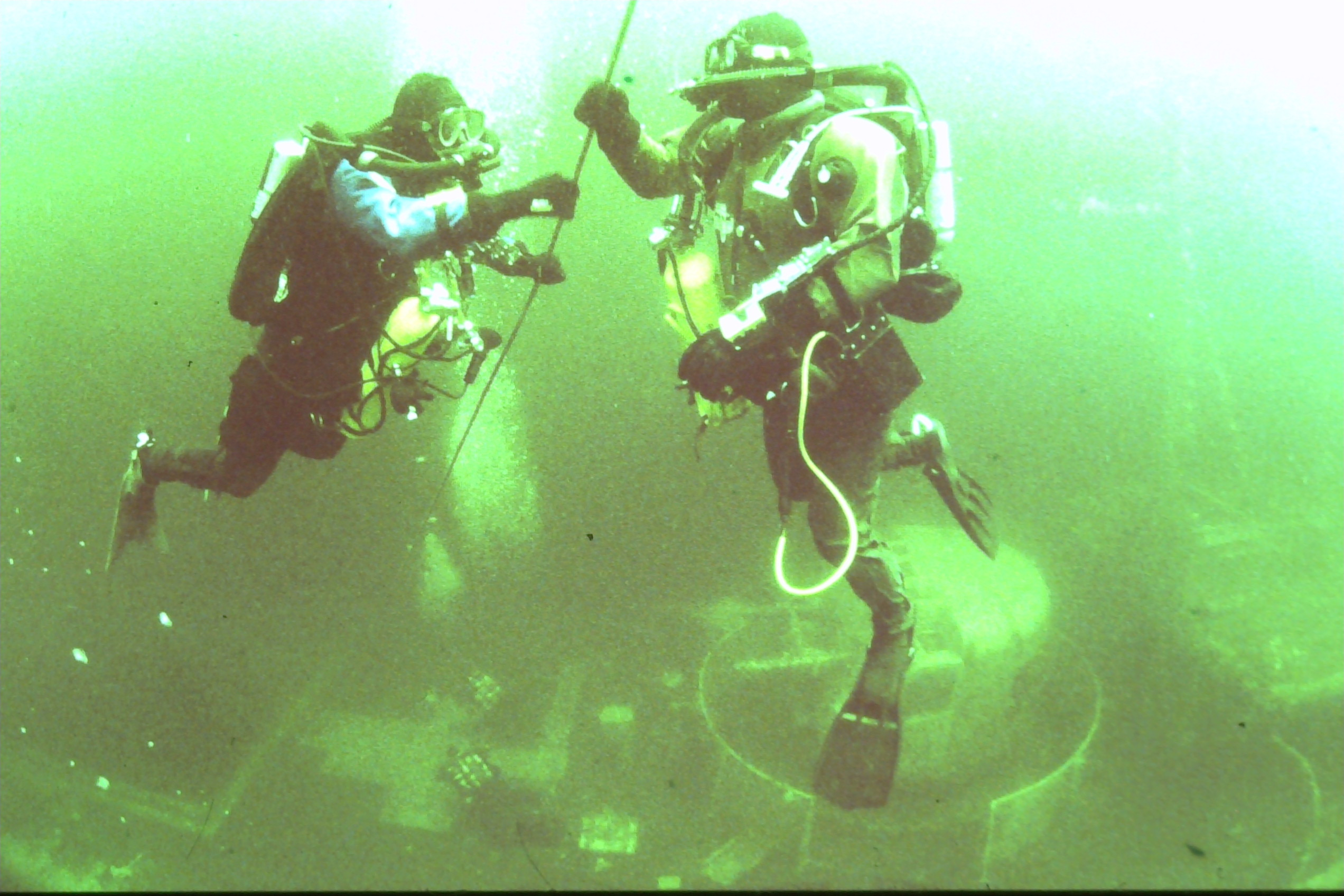
Kiss rebreather testing on HMCS Saskatchewan.

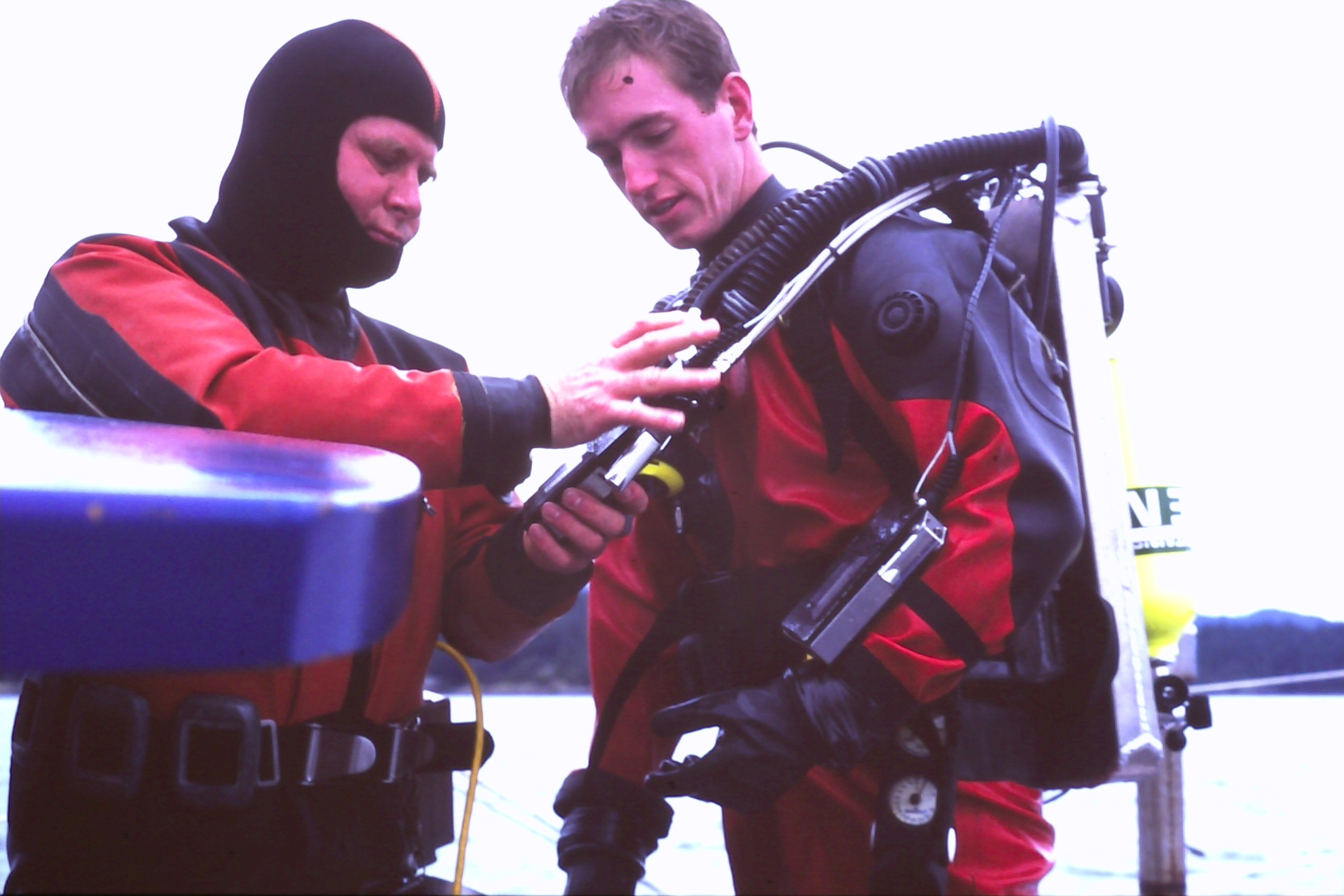
Kiss rebreather testing with Daniel Reinders as diver.

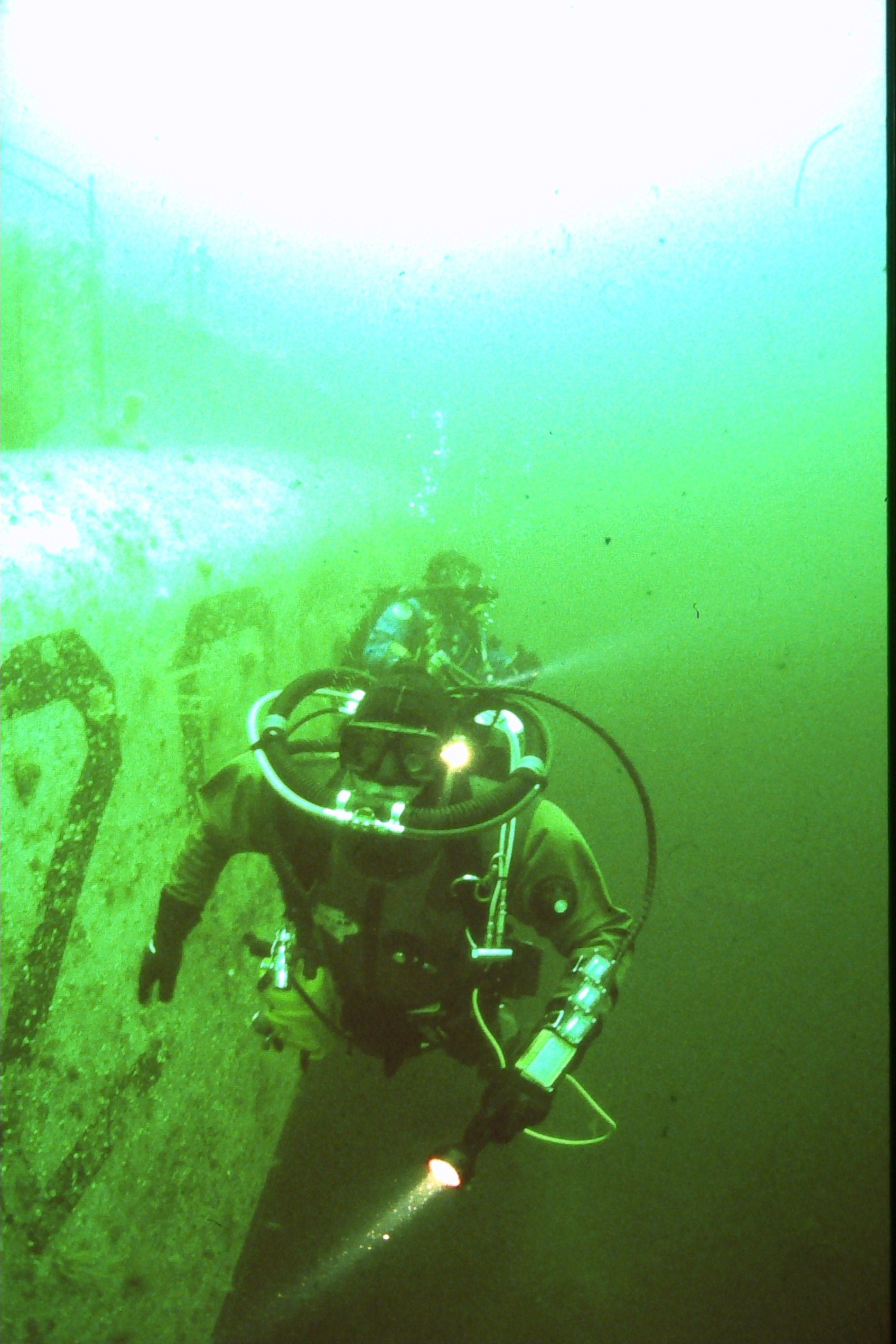
Kiss rebreather testing on HMCS Saskatechewan

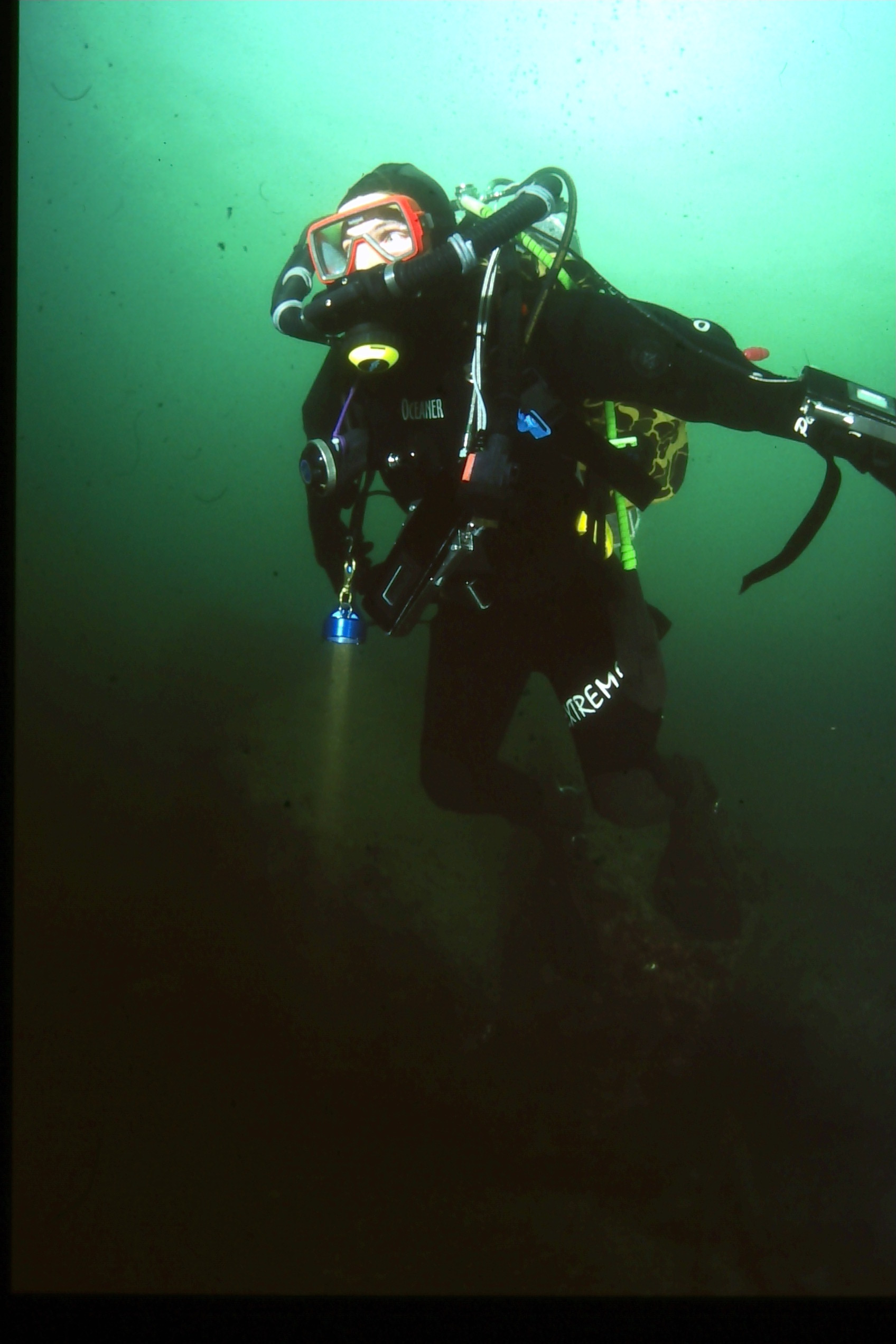
Kiss rebreather testing by Natasha Dickinson.

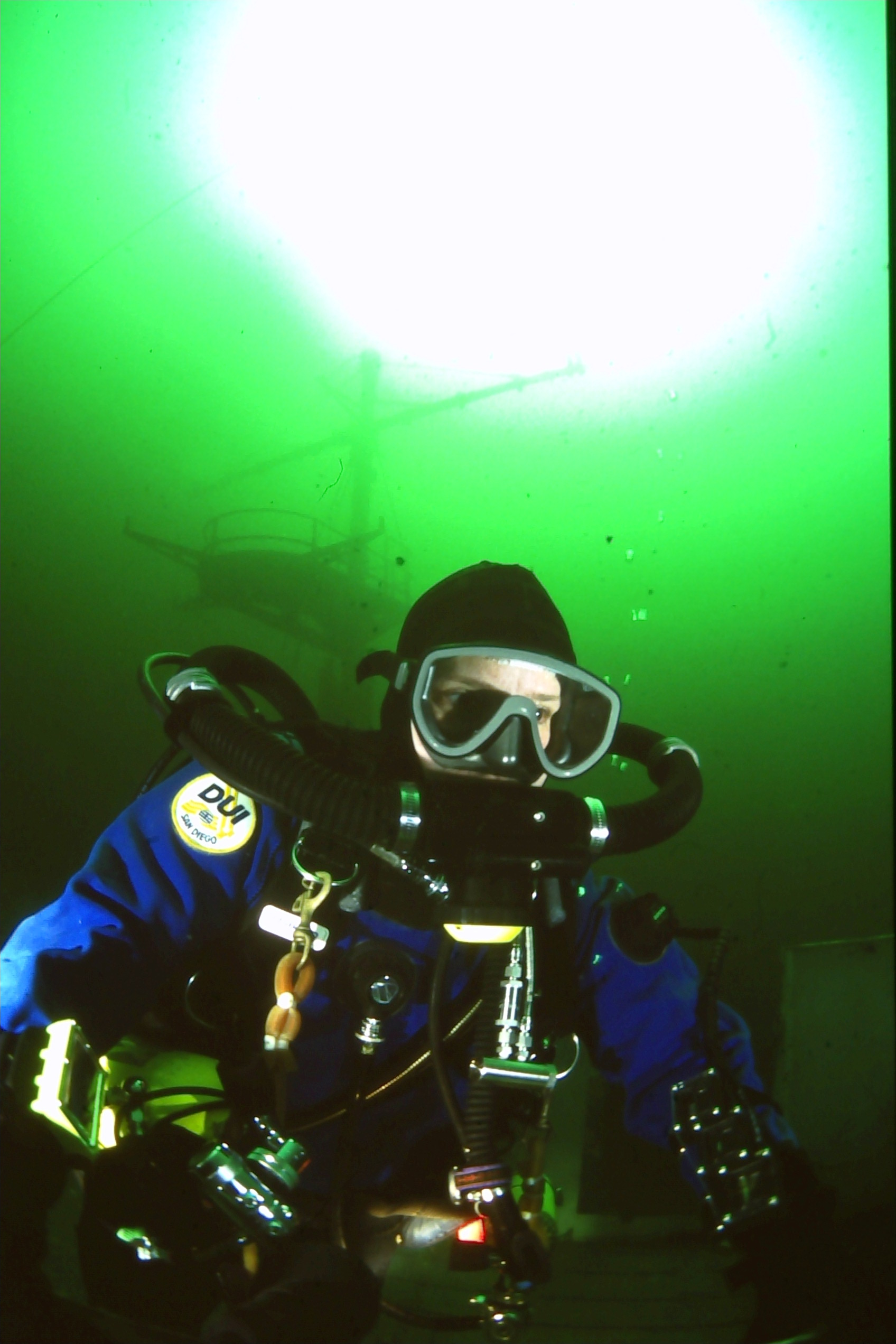
Kiss rebreather testing on HMCS Saskatchewan.

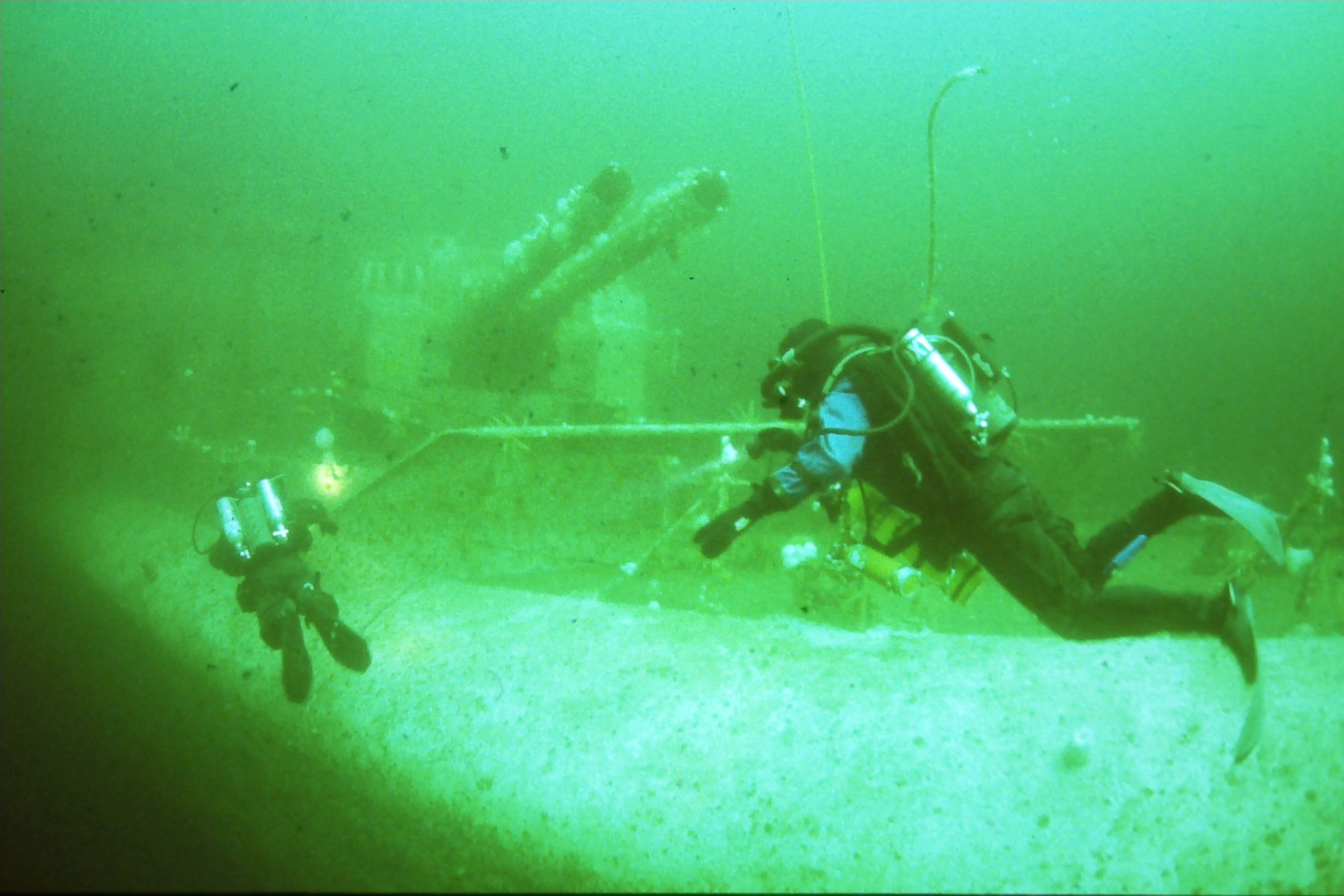
Kiss rebreather testing on HMCS Saskatchewan.

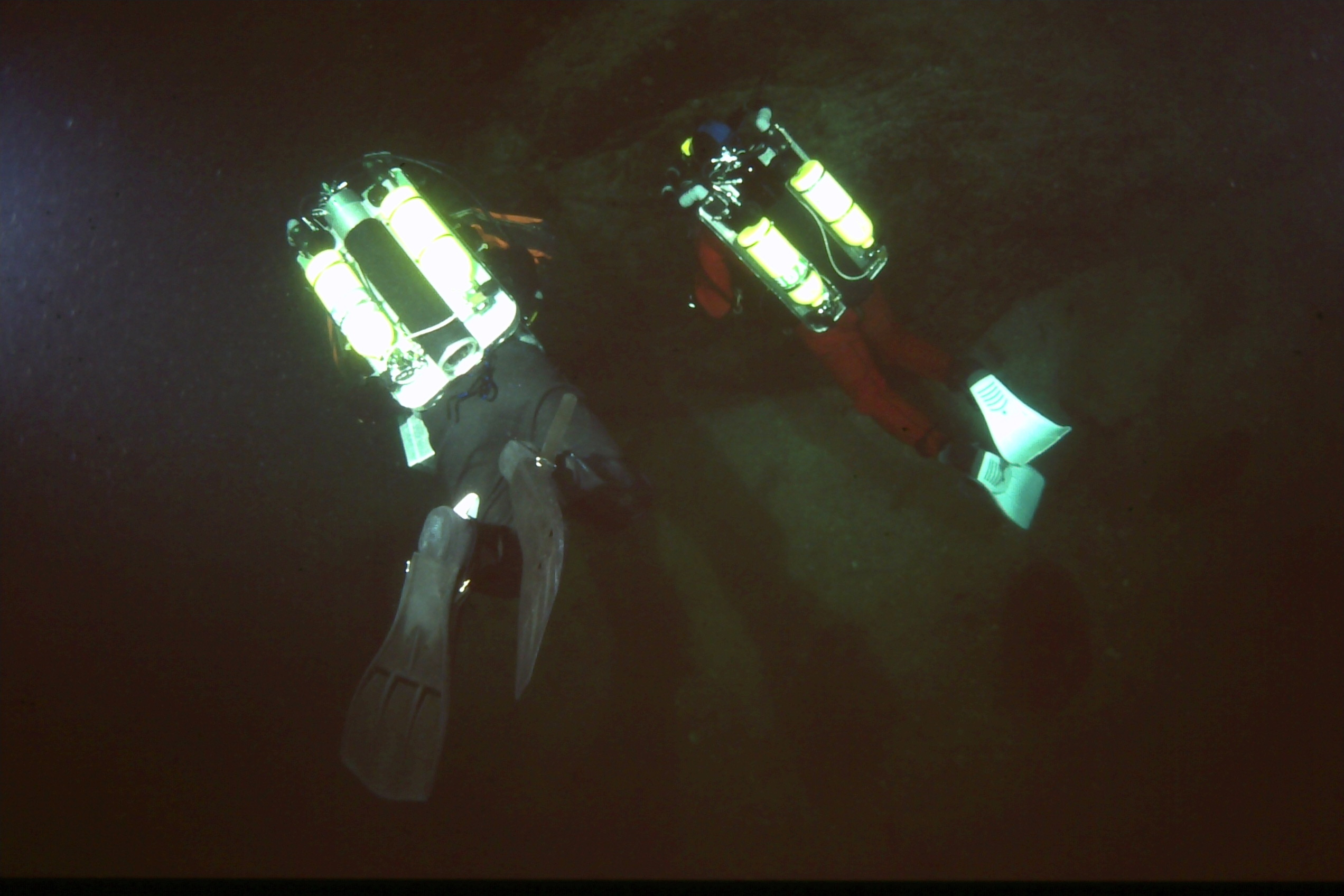
Kiss rebreather testing of the fully closed system by divers Daniel Mayes and Gordon Smith.

== See also ==
- KISS principle – Design principle preferring simplicity
- Diving rebreather – Closed or semi-closed circuit scuba
