= 2006 in the United States =

- Decades: 1980s; 1990s; 2000s; 2010s; 2020s
- See also: History of the United States (1991–2016); Timeline of United States history (1990–2009); List of years in the United States

Events from the year 2006 in the United States.

== Incumbents ==
=== Federal government ===
- President: George W. Bush (R-Texas)
- Vice President: Dick Cheney (R-Wyoming)
- Chief Justice: John Roberts (Maryland)
- Speaker of the House of Representatives: Dennis Hastert (R-Illinois)
- Senate Majority Leader: Bill Frist (R-Tennessee)
- Congress: 109th

==== State governments ====
Governors and lieutenant governors

=== Governors ===
- Governor of Alabama: Bob Riley (Republican)
- Governor of Alaska: Frank Murkowski (Republican) (until December 4), Sarah Palin (Republican) (starting December 4)
- Governor of Arizona: Janet Napolitano (Democratic)
- Governor of Arkansas: Mike Huckabee (Republican)
- Governor of California: Arnold Schwarzenegger (Republican)
- Governor of Colorado: Bill Owens (Republican)
- Governor of Connecticut: Jodi Rell (Republican)
- Governor of Delaware: Ruth Ann Minner (Democratic)
- Governor of Florida: Jeb Bush (Republican)
- Governor of Georgia: Sonny Perdue (Republican)
- Governor of Hawaii: Linda Lingle (Republican)
- Governor of Idaho: Dirk Kempthorne (Republican) (until May 26), Jim Risch (Republican) (starting May 26)
- Governor of Illinois: Rod Blagojevich (Democratic)
- Governor of Indiana: Mitch Daniels (Republican)
- Governor of Iowa: Tom Vilsack (Democratic)
- Governor of Kansas: Kathleen Sebelius (Democratic)
- Governor of Kentucky: Ernie Fletcher (Republican)
- Governor of Louisiana: Kathleen Blanco (Democratic)
- Governor of Maine: John Baldacci (Democratic)
- Governor of Maryland: Robert L. Ehrlich, Jr. (Republican)
- Governor of Massachusetts: Mitt Romney (Republican)
- Governor of Michigan: Jennifer Granholm (Democratic)
- Governor of Minnesota: Tim Pawlenty (Republican)
- Governor of Mississippi: Haley Barbour (Republican)
- Governor of Missouri: Matt Blunt (Republican)
- Governor of Montana: Brian Schweitzer (Democratic)
- Governor of Nebraska: Dave Heineman (Republican)
- Governor of Nevada: Kenny Guinn (Republican)
- Governor of New Hampshire: John Lynch (Democratic)
- Governor of New Jersey: Richard Codey (Democratic) (until January 17), Jon Corzine (Democratic) (starting January 17)
- Governor of New Mexico: Bill Richardson (Democratic)
- Governor of New York: George Pataki (Republican) (until end December 31)
- Governor of North Carolina: Mike Easley (Democratic)
- Governor of North Dakota: John Hoeven (Republican)
- Governor of Ohio: Bob Taft (Republican)
- Governor of Oklahoma: Brad Henry (Democratic)
- Governor of Oregon: Ted Kulongoski (Democratic)
- Governor of Pennsylvania: Ed Rendell (Democratic)
- Governor of Rhode Island: Donald Carcieri (Republican)
- Governor of South Carolina: Mark Sanford (Republican)
- Governor of South Dakota: Mike Rounds (Republican)
- Governor of Tennessee: Phil Bredesen (Democratic)
- Governor of Texas: Rick Perry (Republican)
- Governor of Utah: Jon Huntsman, Jr. (Republican)
- Governor of Vermont: Jim Douglas (Republican)
- Governor of Virginia: Mark Warner (Democratic) (until January 14), Tim Kaine (Democratic) (starting January 14)
- Governor of Washington: Christine Gregoire (Democratic)
- Governor of West Virginia: Joe Manchin (Democratic)
- Governor of Wisconsin: Jim Doyle (Democratic)
- Governor of Wyoming: Dave Freudenthal (Democratic)

=== Lieutenant governors ===
- Lieutenant Governor of Alabama: Lucy Baxley (Democratic)
- Lieutenant Governor of Alaska: Loren Leman (Republican) (until December 4), Sean Parnell (Republican) (starting December 4)
- Lieutenant Governor of Arkansas: Winthrop Paul Rockefeller (Republican) (until July 16), vacant (starting July 16)
- Lieutenant Governor of California: Cruz Bustamante (Democratic)
- Lieutenant Governor of Colorado: Jane Norton (Republican)
- Lieutenant Governor of Connecticut: Kevin B. Sullivan (Democratic)
- Lieutenant Governor of Delaware: John Carney (Democratic)
- Lieutenant Governor of Florida: Toni Jennings (Republican)
- Lieutenant Governor of Georgia: Mark Taylor (Democratic)
- Lieutenant Governor of Hawaii: Duke Aiona (Republican)
- Lieutenant Governor of Idaho:
  - until May 26: Jim Risch (Republican)
  - May 26 – June 15: vacant
  - starting June 15: Mark Ricks (Republican)
- Lieutenant Governor of Illinois: Pat Quinn (Democratic)
- Lieutenant Governor of Indiana: Becky Skillman (Republican)
- Lieutenant Governor of Iowa: Sally Pederson (Democratic)
- Lieutenant Governor of Kansas: John E. Moore (Democratic)
- Lieutenant Governor of Kentucky: Steve Pence (Republican)
- Lieutenant Governor of Louisiana: Mitch Landrieu (Democratic)
- Lieutenant Governor of Maryland: Michael Steele (Republican)
- Lieutenant Governor of Massachusetts: Kerry Healey (Republican)
- Lieutenant Governor of Michigan: John D. Cherry (Democratic)
- Lieutenant Governor of Minnesota: Carol Molnau (Republican)
- Lieutenant Governor of Mississippi: Amy Tuck (Republican)
- Lieutenant Governor of Missouri: Peter Kinder (Republican)
- Lieutenant Governor of Montana: John Bohlinger (Republican)
- Lieutenant Governor of Nebraska: Rick Sheehy (Republican)
- Lieutenant Governor of Nevada: Lorraine Hunt (Republican)
- Lieutenant Governor of New Mexico: Diane Denish (Democratic)
- Lieutenant Governor of New York: Mary Donohue (Republican) (until end of December 31)
- Lieutenant Governor of North Carolina: Bev Perdue (Democratic)
- Lieutenant Governor of North Dakota: Jack Dalrymple (Republican)
- Lieutenant Governor of Ohio: Bruce E. Johnson (Republican) (until December 8), vacant (starting December 8)
- Lieutenant Governor of Oklahoma: Mary Fallin (Republican)
- Lieutenant Governor of Pennsylvania: Catherine Baker Knoll (Democratic)
- Lieutenant Governor of Rhode Island: Charles J. Fogarty (Democratic)
- Lieutenant Governor of South Carolina: André Bauer (Republican)
- Lieutenant Governor of South Dakota: Dennis Daugaard (Republican)
- Lieutenant Governor of Tennessee: John S. Wilder (Democratic)
- Lieutenant Governor of Texas: David Dewhurst (Republican)
- Lieutenant Governor of Utah: Gary Herbert (Republican)
- Lieutenant Governor of Vermont: Brian Dubie (Republican)
- Lieutenant Governor of Virginia: Tim Kaine (Democratic) (until January 14), Bill Bolling (Republican) (starting January 14)
- Lieutenant Governor of Washington: Brad Owen (Democratic)
- Lieutenant Governor of Wisconsin: Barbara Lawton (Democratic)

== Events ==
=== January ===
January 19: New Horizons probe launched from Cape Canaveral.

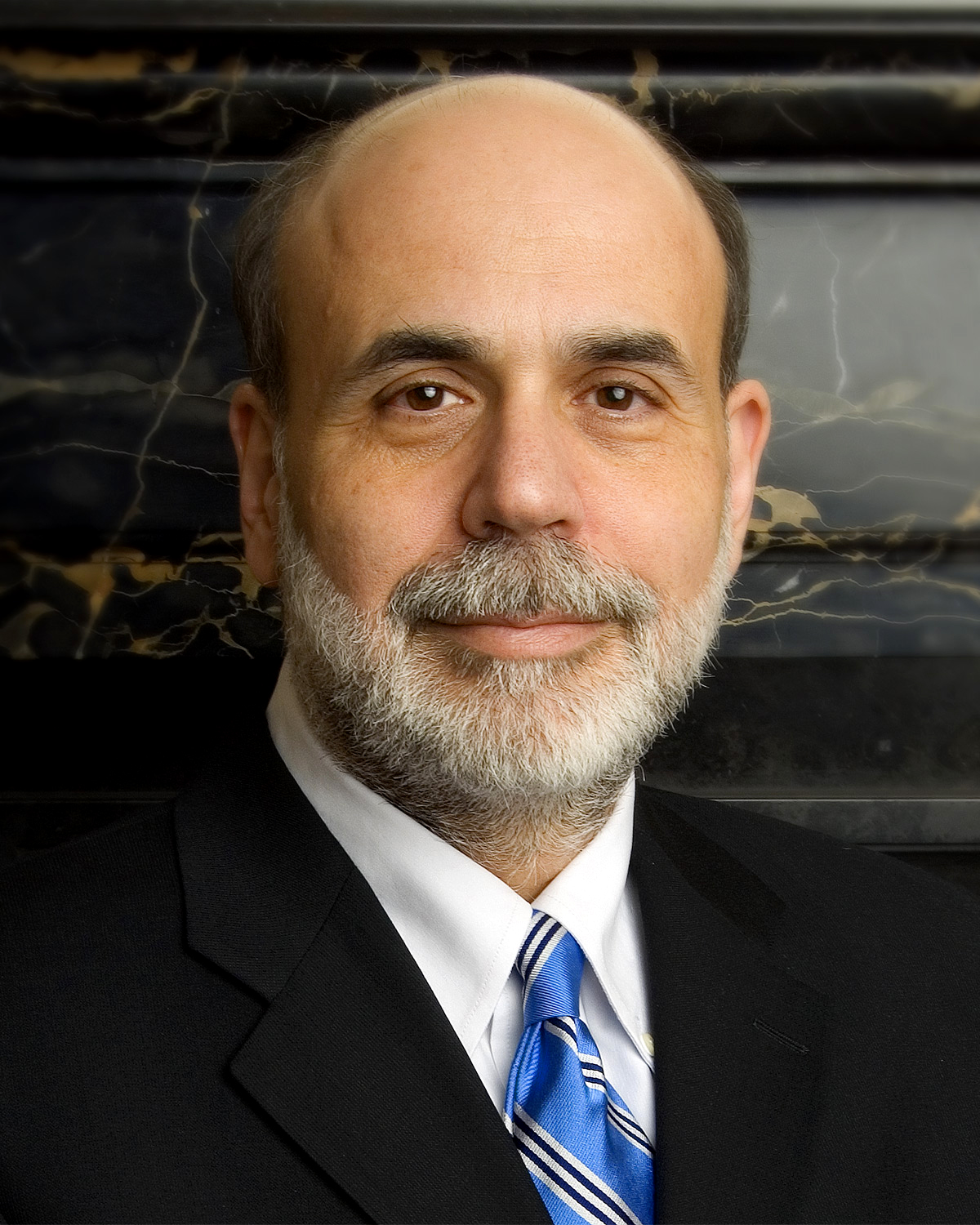
January 30: Ben Bernanke 14th chairman of the Federal Reserve

- January 2
  - The annual Rose Parade in California is drenched in heavy rain for the first time in 51 years.
  - PepsiCo announces its purchase of Star Foods for an undisclosed price saying that the purchase would strengthen its place as Poland's number one seller of potato chips.
- January 3 – Twelve dead coal miners and one survivor are discovered in the Sago Mine disaster near Buckhannon, West Virginia.
- January 4 – The Texas Longhorns led by Vince Young defeat the USC Trojans in the 2006 Rose Bowl 41–38, regarded as one of the greatest college football games ever played.
- January 5
  - The Bush administration proposes spending $114 million on educational programs to expand the teaching of Arabic, Chinese, Persian and other languages typically not taught in public schools.
  - IBM says that it would freeze pension benefits for its American employees starting in 2008 and offer them only a 401k retirement plan in future.
- January 6
  - AOL agrees to pay customers as much as $25 million to settle claims that it wrongly billed them for some online services and products.
  - NYSE says that it has picked Bear Wagner as the firm that will handle trading of its shares when it goes public.
- January 7 – Embroiled in multiple scandals, former U.S. House Majority Leader Tom DeLay announces he will not seek to reassume his former post.
- January 8 – World Wrestling Entertainment holds its New Year's Revolution pay-per-view event from the Pepsi Arena in Albany, New York.
- January 9
  - Vice President Dick Cheney complains of shortness of breath and is treated at the hospital. The White House says the trip was necessary because of fluid retention as a side effect of a drug Mr. Cheney had taken to treat chronic foot ailments.
  - The Dow Jones Industrial Average closes above 11,000 (11,011.90) for the first time since June 7, 2001.
- January 10 – Governor Arnold Schwarzenegger proposes a $125.6 billion budget increasing spending without raising taxes.
- January 11 – The Augustine Volcano in Alaska erupts twice, marking its first major eruption since 1986.
- January 13
  - The US Government reports that wholesale inflation in 2005 increased by highest amount since 1990.
  - Rick Wagoner, CEO of the loss-making General Motors says that results will improve in 2006 and 2007.
- January 15 – NASA's Stardust mission successfully ends, the first to return dust from a comet.
- January 17 – California executes Clarence Ray Allen (death by lethal injection), who was sentenced to death in 1982 for arranging the murders of three people.
- January 18 – American International Group (AIG), the world's largest insurer, says that its chief operating officer Donald P. Kanak has resigned and stepped down from the board "for personal reasons".
- January 19 – NASA launches the New Horizons spacecraft in a 9-year, 3 billion mile space mission, to flyby and observe the dwarf planetary system of Pluto/Charon and possibly other Kuiper belt objects.
- January 20 – A Maryland judge strikes down a state law banning same-sex marriage saying the measure violated a state constitutional amendment prohibiting sex discrimination.
- January 26 – General Motors reports an $8.6 billion loss for 2006, its biggest loss since 1992.
- January 27 – An inhaled form of insulin wins federal approval offering an alternative to injections for millions of people with diabetes.
- January 29 – World Wrestling Entertainment holds its Royal Rumble pay-per-view event from the American Airlines Arena in Miami, Florida.
- January 30
  - The White House announces that President Bush has chosen Professor Edward Lazear, a Stanford University business professor to succeed Ben Bernanke as chairman of his Council of Economic Advisors who will succeed Alan Greenspan as Chairman of the Federal Reserve.
  - Jennifer San Marco kills seven people before committing suicide at a postal facility in Goleta, California. San Marco had worked at the facility previously, but had been let go due to her erratic behavior.
- January 31
  - State of the Union Address.
  - Samuel Alito is sworn in as an associate justice of the Supreme Court of the United States.
  - Two federal appeals courts uphold rulings that the Partial Birth Abortion Act passed by the United States Congress in 2003 is unconstitutional because it does not include an exception when the health of a pregnant woman is at risk.

=== February ===
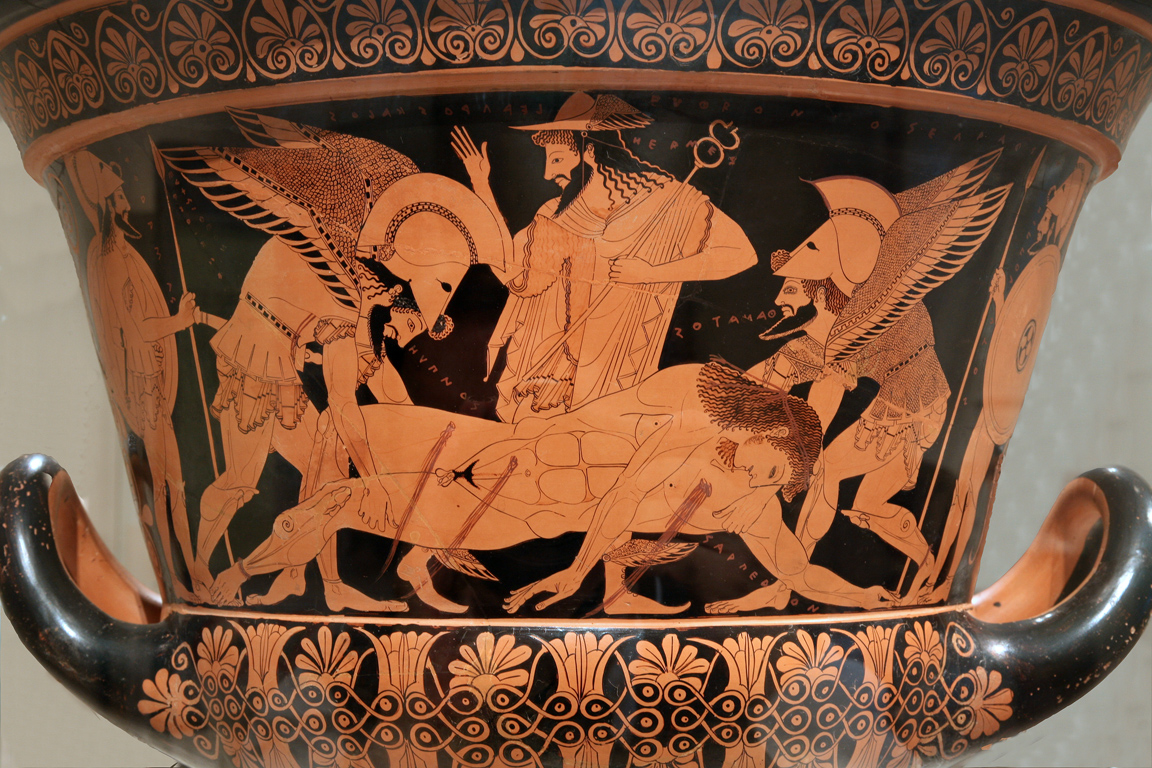
February 2: Euphronios Krater.

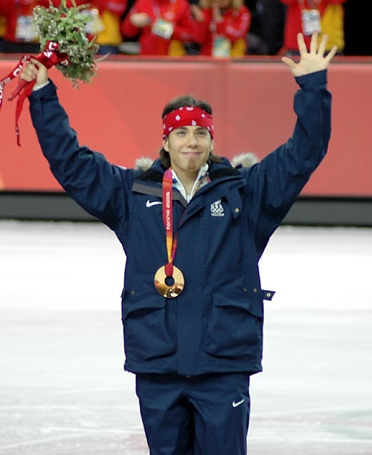
February 10 – 26: Gold medalist Apolo Ohno at the Men's 500 meters medal ceremony.

- February 1 – UAL Corporation, United Airlines' parent company, emerges from bankruptcy after being in that position since December 9, 2002, the longest such filing in history.
- February 2 – After over 30 years, the Metropolitan Museum of Art says it would relinquish ownership of a 2,500-year-old Greek vase, the Euphronios Krater, to Italy.
- February 3 – Suspicious fires destroy three small churches and damage two others in Bibb County, Alabama.
- February 5 – Super Bowl XL: The Pittsburgh Steelers defeat the Seattle Seahawks by a score of 21–10 at Ford Field in Detroit. It is a homecoming for Detroit native Jerome Bettis, who was playing the final game of his 12-year career.
- February 9 – AIG apologizes for deceptive business practices and reaches a $1.64 billion settlement with federal and state securities and insurance regulators.
- February 10–26 – The United States competes at the Winter Olympics in Turin, Italy and wins 9 gold, 9 silver and 7 bronze medals.
- February 11 – Vice President Dick Cheney accidentally shoots and wounds a lawyer while quail hunting in southern Texas.
- February 14 – The Coca-Cola Company says that Warren Buffett, the soft drink maker's largest shareholder, would leave the board in April after 19 years to spend more time managing Berkshire Hathaway.
- February 15 – A group of institutional investors already involved in a lawsuit with the company sue Tyco International to stop its proposed breakup plan.
- February 16
  - The state of Minnesota sues AIG for underreporting premiums to reduce its tax bill refusing a settlement of $1.2 million.
  - The chairman of the Federal Reserve, Ben Bernanke, testifies to the US Senate that Chinese ownership of US assets is not large enough to put the country at risk economically.
  - The Department of Commerce reports that housing starts jumped 14.5% to a 33-year high in January.
- February 19 – World Wrestling Entertainment holds its No Way Out pay-per-view event from the 1st Mariner Arena in Baltimore, Maryland.

=== March ===
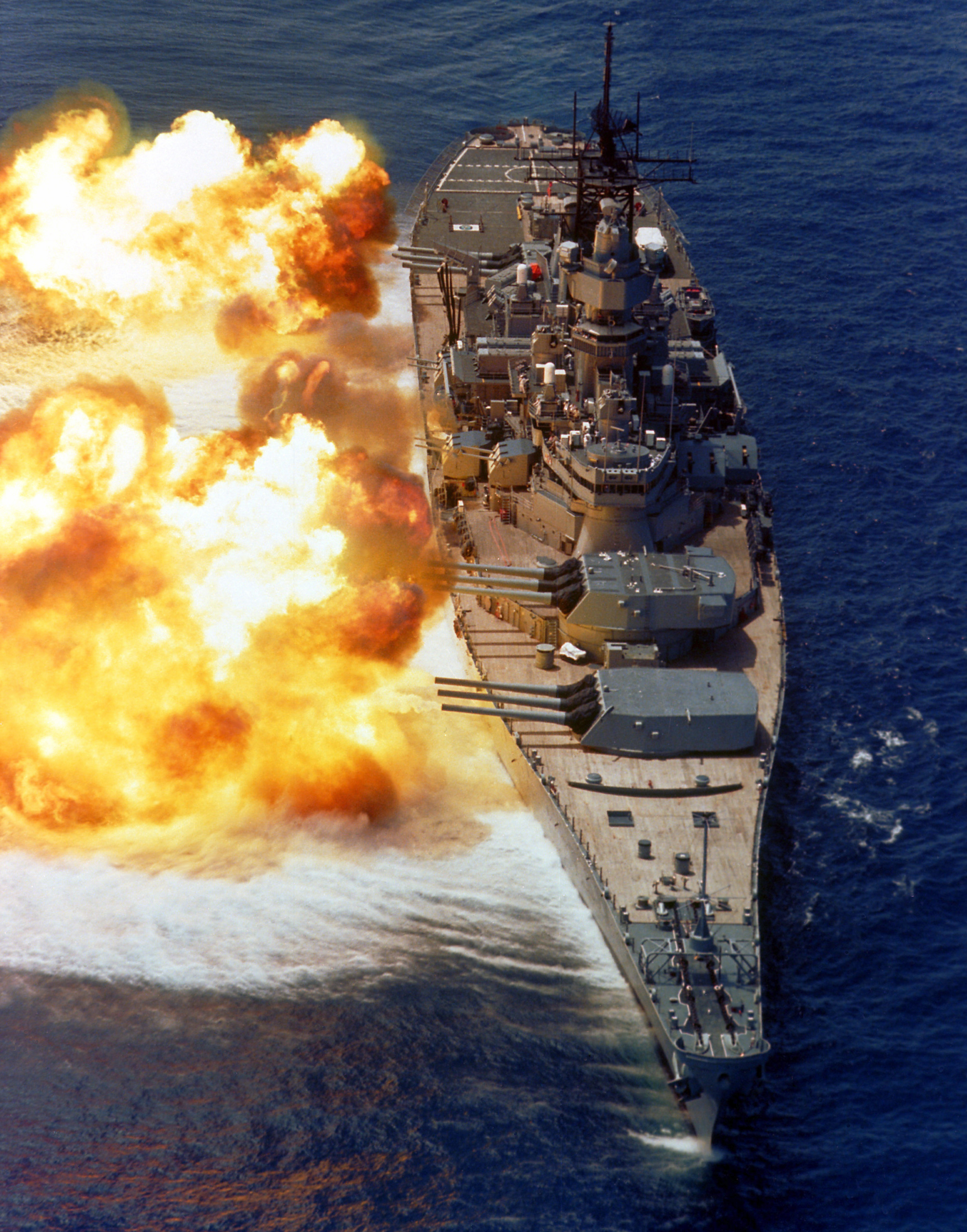
March 17: Iowa-class battleship

- March 2 – The colorized $10 bill is released, with the same color-shifting ink and security features of the $20 and $50 bills that preceded it.
- March 4 – The final contact attempt with Pioneer 10 receives no response.
- March 5 – The 78th Academy Awards, hosted by Jon Stewart, are held at Kodak Theatre in Hollywood, with Paul Haggis' Crash controversially winning Best Picture. The film is part of a four-way tie in winning the most awards, with it, Ang Lee's Brokeback Mountain, Peter Jackson's King Kong and Rob Marshall's Memoirs of a Geisha all winning three. Brokeback Mountain leads with eight nominations, with Lee also winning Best Director. The telecast garners nearly 39 million viewers.
- March 6–20 – The first World Baseball Classic is held in San Diego, California.
- March 9 – NASA's Cassini-Huygens spacecraft discovers geysers of a liquid substance shooting from Saturn's moon Enceladus, signaling a possible presence of water.
- March 10 – NASA's Mars Reconnaissance Orbiter enters Mars orbit.
- March 14 – Crystal Mangum makes false rape accusations against three members of the Duke University men's lacrosse team, an event which marked the beginning of the Duke lacrosse case.
- March 16 – The Blu-ray disc format is released in the United States.
- March 17 – The United States strikes its 2 remaining Iowa-class battleships from the Naval Vessel Register, ending the age of the battleship.
- March 22 – The Federal Reserve stops the publishing of M3 money supply data.
- March 25 – Seven die in the Capitol Hill massacre in Seattle, Washington. Perpetrator Kyle Huff's rampage is fueled by his hatred of "rave scene" gatherings.

=== April ===
- April 2 – World Wrestling Entertainment holds WrestleMania 22 at the Allstate Arena in Rosemont, Illinois.
- April 4 – First material action in the Minor League Baseball umpire strike.
- April 29 – Massive anti-war demonstrations and a march down Broadway in New York City mark the third year of war in Iraq.
- April 30 – World Wrestling Entertainment holds its Backlash pay-per-view event from the Rupp Arena in Lexington, Kentucky.

=== May ===
- May 1 – The Great American Boycott takes place across the United States as marchers protest for immigration rights.
- May 5 – Fiat chairman Sergio Marchionne announces that the Alfa Romeo automobile brand will return to the United States in 2008, after a 13-year hiatus.
- May 21 – World Wrestling Entertainment holds its Judgment Day pay-per-view event from the US Airways Center in Phoenix, Arizona.

=== June ===
- June 7 – Al-Qaeda in Iraq leader Abu Musab al-Zarqawi and seven of his aides are killed in a U.S. air raid just north of the town of Baquba, Iraq.
- June 8 – The FDA approves Gardasil, the first vaccine against human papillomavirus (HPV).
- June 9 – Pixar Animation Studios' seventh feature film, Cars, is released in theaters.
- June 11 – World Wrestling Entertainment holds its ECW One Night Stand pay-per-view event from the Hammerstein Ballroom in New York City, New York.
- June 12 – Pittsburgh Steelers quarterback Ben Roethlisberger crashes his motorcycle near Pittsburgh's 10th Street bridge. He is rushed to Mercy Hospital for emergency surgery.
- June 19 – The Carolina Hurricanes defeat the Edmonton Oilers 3–1 in game 7 of the 2006 Stanley Cup Finals to give the Hurricanes their first Stanley Cup in franchise history. It is also the first Stanley Cup Finals since the 2004–05 lockout that cancelled all games that year.
- June 20 – The Miami Heat defeat the Dallas Mavericks in the 2006 NBA Finals in six games, winning their first NBA championship in franchise history.
- June 23 – In Miami, the Federal Bureau of Investigation arrests seven men, accusing them of planning to bomb the Sears Tower and other attacks in Miami.
- June 25
  - Warren Buffett donates over $30 billion to the Bill & Melinda Gates Foundation.
  - World Wrestling Entertainment holds its Vengeance pay-per-view event from the Charlotte Bobcats Arena in Charlotte, North Carolina.
- June 26 – Papahānaumokuākea Marine National Monument in Hawaii is established as the largest protected area in the world.

=== July ===
- July 4 – STS–121: Space Shuttle Discovery is launched to the International Space Station. It returns safely on July 17. It is the second "return to flight" mission after the Space Shuttle Columbia disaster.
- July 5 – North Korea test fires missiles, timed with the liftoff of Space Shuttle Discovery, preceding the fireworks celebrations that night in America. The long range Taepodong–2 reportedly fails shortly after takeoff.
- July 7 – Pirates of the Caribbean: Dead Man's Chest is released in theaters as the second film in the Pirates of the Caribbean series, marking the debut of the CGI Walt Disney Pictures logo arranged by Mark Mancina.
- July 10 – Henry Paulson is sworn in as the new Secretary of Treasury, succeeding John W. Snow.
- July 22 – Needles, California experiences a record high low temperature of 100 °F (38 °C) at 6:00 am with a high temperature exceeding 120 °F (49 °C), making it one of the few locations on Earth that have recorded a triple-digit overnight low temperature.
- July 23 – World Wrestling Entertainment holds its The Great American Bash pay-per-view event from the Conseco Fieldhouse in Indianapolis, Indiana.

=== August ===
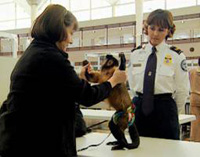
August 10: A United States TSA agent inspects a service monkey before a flight.

- August 10 – London Metropolitan Police make 21 arrests in connection to an apparent terrorist plot that involved aircraft traveling from the United Kingdom to the United States. Liquids and gels are banned from checked and carry-on baggage. As of September 26, the Transportation Security Administration adjusts its ban on liquids, aerosols and gels. Travelers are permitted to carry liquids through security checkpoints in containers of 3.4 ounces (100 mL) or less that fit comfortably in one quart-size clear plastic zip-top bag. This procedure came to be known as "3–1–1 for carry-ons" (3.4 ounce containers in a 1 quart bag, 1 bag per passenger). Items purchased in the airside zone after clearing security could be brought on board without restriction. Other exemptions to this restriction include medications and breast milk.
- August 20 – World Wrestling Entertainment holds its SummerSlam event from the TD Banknorth Garden in Boston, Massachusetts.
- August 27 – Comair Flight 5191, carrying 50 people, crashes shortly after takeoff from Blue Grass Airport in Lexington, Kentucky. Forty-nine people are killed, leaving the first officer as the sole survivor of the accident.
- August 28 – A Greyhound Lines bus from New York City to Montreal carrying 52 people crashes at mile 115 on Interstate 87 near Elizabethtown, killing five people, including the driver, and seriously injuring others.
- August 29 – The United States commemorates the first anniversary of Hurricane Katrina.

=== September ===
- September 3 – Gordon B. Hinckley dedicates the Sacramento California Temple, the LDS Church's seventh temple in California.
- September 4 – While filming Ocean's Deadliest, television host Steve Irwin is stung by a sting ray and killed off the coast of Australia.
- September 8 – The world's tallest living tree, a 115.61 metres (379.3 ft) tall coast redwood (sequoia) now named "Hyperion", is discovered in Redwood National Park.
- September 11 – The United States commemorates the fifth anniversary of the 9/11 attacks in New York City.
- September 15 – Spinach contaminated with E. coli kills two and poisons over 100 others in 20 states.
- September 18 – The CW network debuts as the sixth broadcast network, merging with UPN (owned by CBS Corporation which split from the original Viacom, three days after UPN ceased operations) and The WB (owned by Warner Bros., a day after The WB ceased operations).
- September 25 – The New Orleans Saints play their first game at the Louisiana Superdome since Hurricane Katrina with a 23–3 victory over NFC South rival Atlanta Falcons.

=== October ===
- October – The unemployment rate drops to 4.4%, the lowest since May 2001.
- October 2 – Charles Carl Roberts IV, a 32-year-old milk-truck driver, kills five girls at an Amish schoolhouse in Lancaster County, Pennsylvania, before shooting himself.
- October 3 – The Dow Jones Industrial Average gains 56.99 points, or 0.49 percent, with a close of 11,727.34, its first all-time high in more than 6 years after it last hit in a record high of 11,722.98 on January 20, 2000.
- October 6 – A hazardous waste plant near Apex, North Carolina explodes, releasing chlorine gas, and resulting in the evacuation of thousands and the hospitalization of over 200 residents.
- October 8 – World Wrestling Entertainment holds its No Mercy pay-per-view event from the RBC Center in Raleigh, North Carolina.
- October 10 – Google buys YouTube for $1.65 billion.
- October 11 – A plane crashes into a high-rise building in New York City, killing two.
- October 12 – Lake Storm "Aphid": A freak snowstorm blows into Buffalo, New York, leaving over 400,000 without power and killing 13.
- October 16
  - The last American MASH is decommissioned.
  - The Chicago Bears defeat the Arizona Cardinals 24–23 on Monday Night Football, after overcoming a 20-point deficit and six turnovers at the University of Phoenix Stadium in Glendale, Arizona.
- October 19 – The Dow Jones Industrial Average closes 12,000 for the first time, 12,011.73.
- October 24 – NASA's MESSENGER spacecraft makes its first flyby of Venus (it will be captured into Mercury's orbit on March 18, 2011).
- October 27 – 2006 World Series: The St. Louis Cardinals defeat the Detroit Tigers in five games to win their 10th World Series championship.

=== November ===
- November 1 – Oklahoma becomes the last state to legalize tattooing, having banned it since 1963.
- November 5 – World Wrestling Entertainment holds its Cyber Sunday pay-per-view event from the U.S. Bank Arena in Cincinnati, Ohio.
- November 7 – The midterm elections result in a historic victory for the Democrats, who gain control of both chambers of Congress and a majority of the state governorships.
- November 10 – The final episode of Reading Rainbow airs on PBS.
- November 19 – Nintendo's Wii is released in the United States.
- November 26 – World Wrestling Entertainment holds its Survivor Series pay-per-view event from the Wachovia Center in Philadelphia, Pennsylvania.

=== December ===
- December 3 – World Wrestling Entertainment holds its December to Dismember pay-per-view event from the James Brown Arena in Augusta, Georgia.
- December 7 – Smoking is banned in all Ohio bars, restaurants, workplaces and other public places.
- December 10 – Space Shuttle Mission STS–116: Space Shuttle Discovery lifts off from the Kennedy Space Center on the first night launch since the 2003 loss of Columbia.
- December 13 – U.S. Senator Tim Johnson (D–South Dakota) suffers a brain hemorrhage during a conference call with reporters.
- December 14 – The U.S. spy satellite USA–193, also known as NRO Launch 21 (NROL–21 or simply L–21), is launched but malfunctions.
- December 15 – Lockheed Martin's F–35 Lightning II Joint Strike Fighter successfully flies for the first time.
- December 17 – World Wrestling Entertainment holds its Armageddon pay-per-view event from the Richmond Coliseum in Richmond, Virginia.
- December 18 – Robert Gates is sworn in as the new Secretary of Defense, succeeding Donald Rumsfeld.
- December 20 – The Postal Accountability and Enhancement Act is signed into law.
- December 22 – The Space Shuttle Discovery lands at Kennedy Space Center, concluding a two-week mission to the International Space Station.
- December 25 – Funk singer James Brown dies of a heart attack at the age of 73.
- December 26 – Former President Gerald Ford dies at the age of 93 in Rancho Mirage, California.
- December 30 – Former Iraqi President Saddam Hussein is executed by hanging for crimes against humanity.

=== Undated ===
- United States housing bubble: A total of 1,259,118 foreclosures are filed during 2006, up 42 percent from 2005.
- Subprime mortgage crisis: This summer, the housing bubble bursts, starting a chain of events that eventually develops into a full-blown market meltdown.
- Mangroomer shaving product is introduced.
- OneSimCard, an international cell phone service provider is founded.
- For Fair Trade Towns USA, Media, Pennsylvania is the first fair trade town in the United States.
- Fight Forever Foundation: is founded in Illinois.
- The Culinistas, a home-chef and boutique catering service is founded.

=== Ongoing ===
- War in Afghanistan (2001–2014)
- Iraq War (2003–2011)

== Births ==
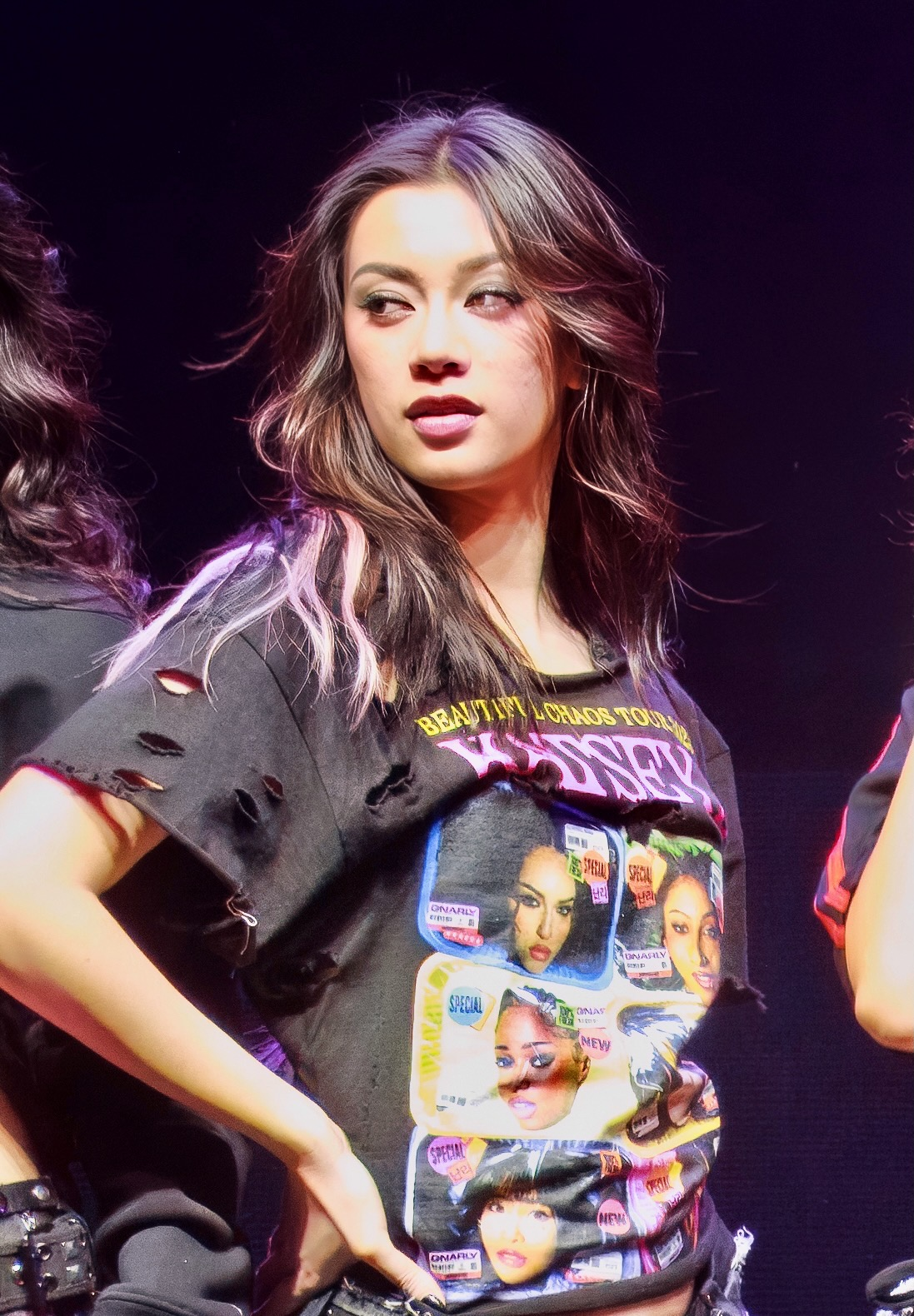
Megan Skiendiel

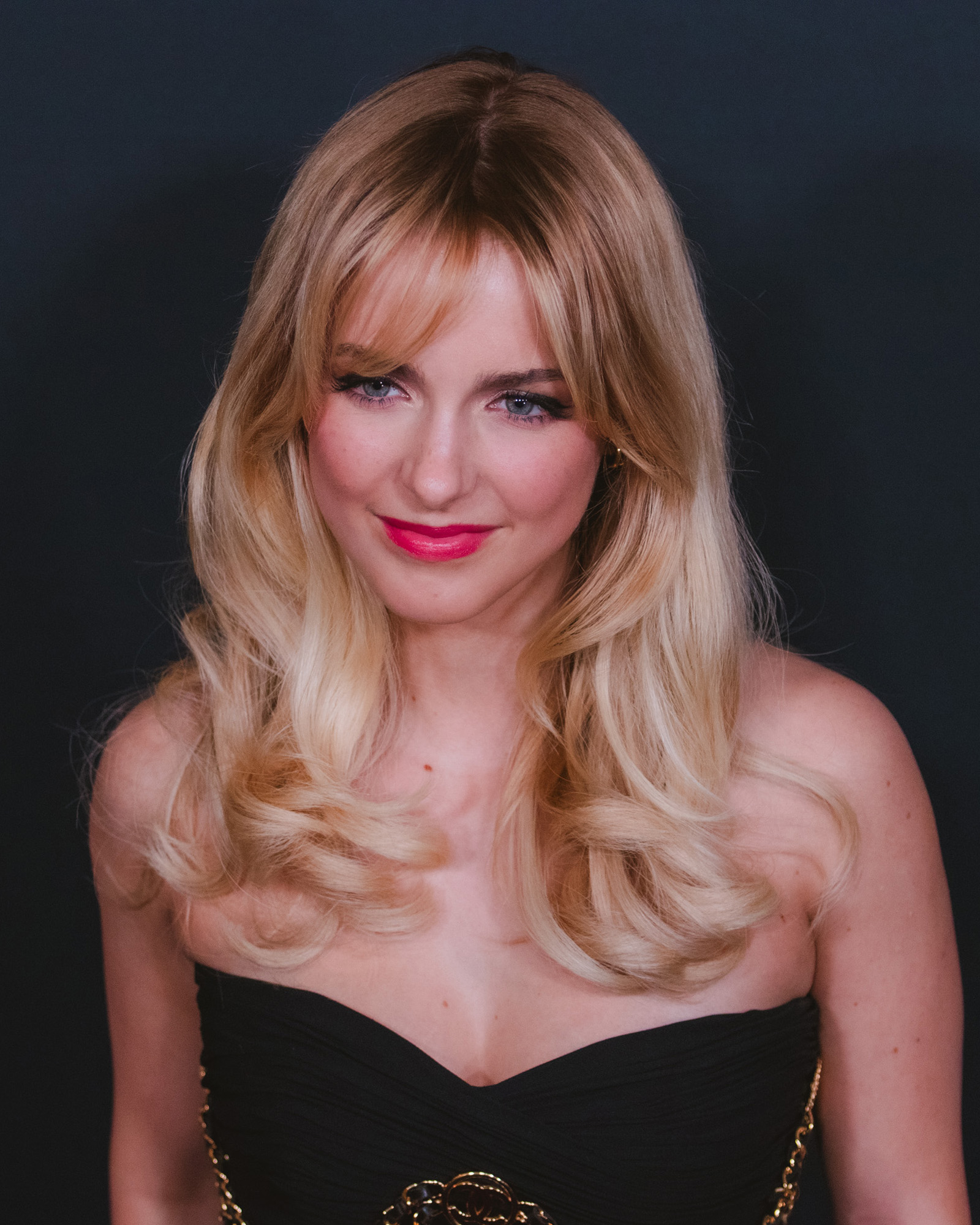
Mckenna Grace

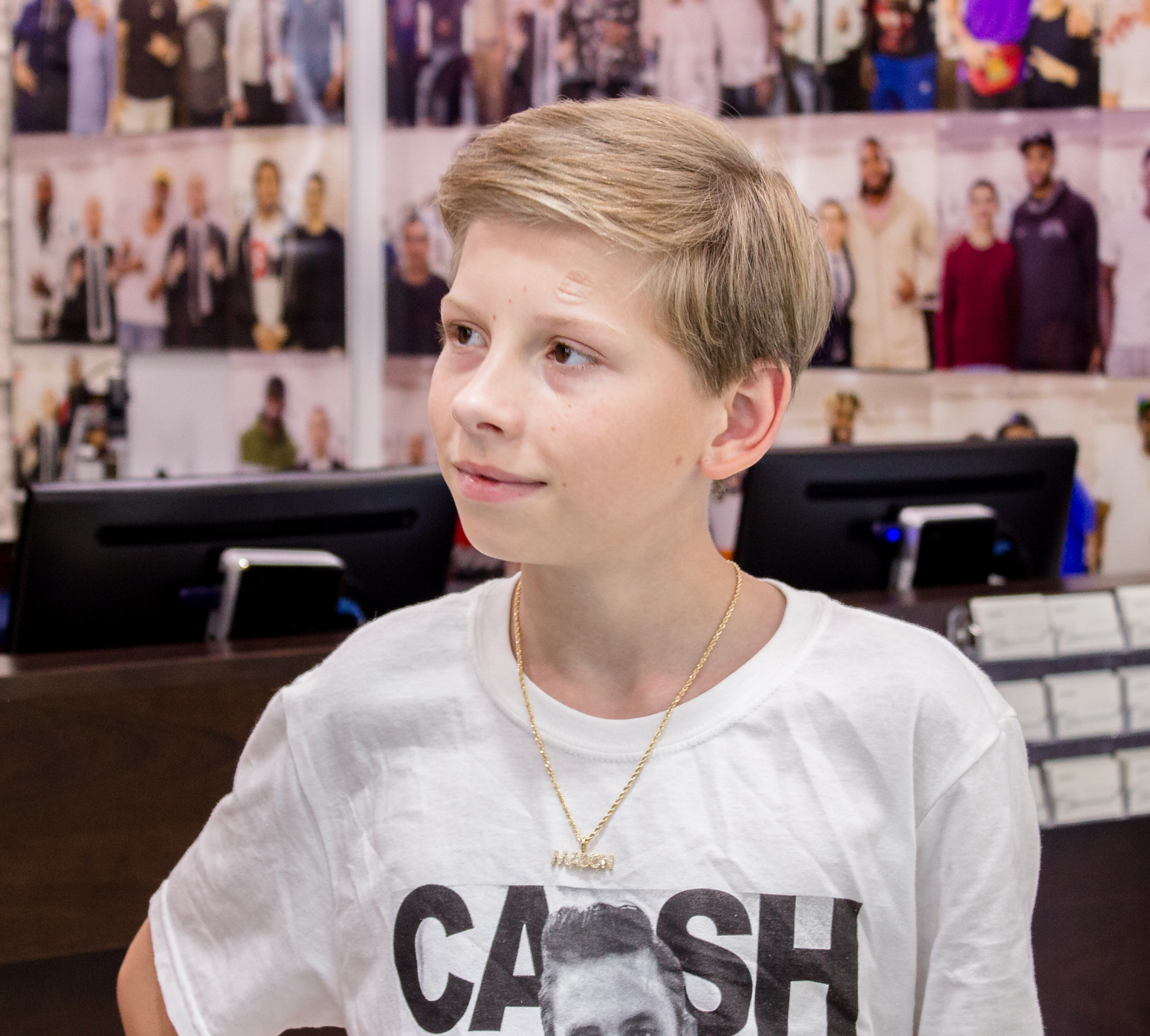
Mason Ramsey

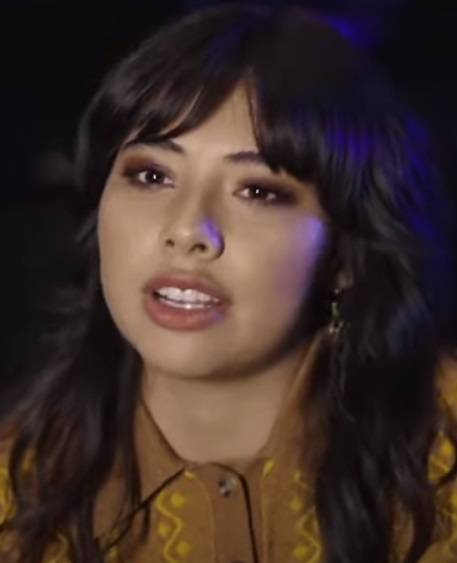
Xochitl Gomez

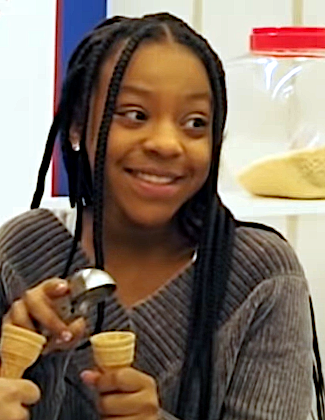
Priah Ferguson

- January 17 – Nick Holliday, soccer player
- January 17 – Adrian Wibowo, Indonesian soccer player
- January 26 – Mo Gaba, notable baseball superfan and cancer victim (d. 2020)
- February 10 – Megan Skiendiel, singer, dancer and actress
- February 14 – Josh Pierson, racing driver
- February 17 – Matthew Corcoran, soccer player
- March 1 – Julian Grey, actor
- March 20 – Barron Trump, son of Donald Trump
- March 27 – Kaii Winkler, swimmer
- March 29 – Haven Coleman, activist
- April 4 – Minna Stess, skateboarder
- April 15 – Katherine Ong Pui Kuan, Malaysian figure skater
- April 26 – Andy Walken, actor
- April 29 – Xochitl Gomez, actress
- May 1 – Gianna Bryant, daughter of Kobe Bryant (d. 2020)
- June 1 – Bombette Martin, skateboarder
- June 25 – Mckenna Grace, actress
- June 28 – Laurel Griggs, actress (d. 2019)
- June 29 – Sam Lavagnino, voice actor
- July 16 – Corey Jackson, rapper
- July 22 – Javon Walton, boxer, gymnast
- July 28 – Katelyn Jong, gymnast
- August 17 – E. J. Tamayo, stock car racing driver
- August 23 – Victoria Martens, notable victim of child abuse (d. 2016)
- September 4 – Maximus Williamson, swimmer
- September 7
  - Dannielynn Birkhead, notable paternity case subject and daughter of Anna Nicole Smith
  - Ian Chen, actor
- September 8 – Desideri Trujillo, film director, actor, writer, editor, animator and music supervisor
- September 12 – Zackary Arthur, actor
- September 13 – Isabella Rice, actress
- September 17 – Ella Jay Basco, actress
- October 1 – Priah Ferguson, actress
- October 16 – Naomi Wadler, activist
- October 18 – Charlotte Figi, notable medical cannabidiol patient and rare disease victim (d. 2020)
- October 30 – Saniyya Sidney, actress
- November 2 – Hilde Lysiak, journalist
- November 9 – Honestie Hodges, notable victim of police brutality (d. 2020)
- November 16 – Mason Ramsey, singer
- December 2 – Ruby Lilley, skateboarder
- December 5 – Ava Kolker, actress
- December 19 – Christopher Yoo, chess player

== Deaths ==
=== January ===
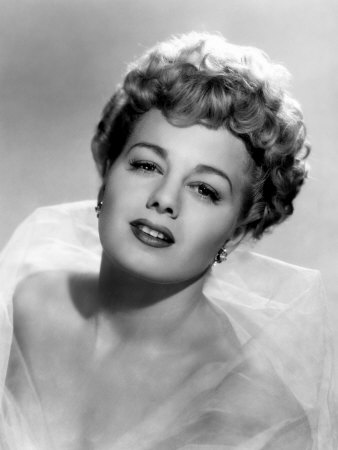
Shelley Winters

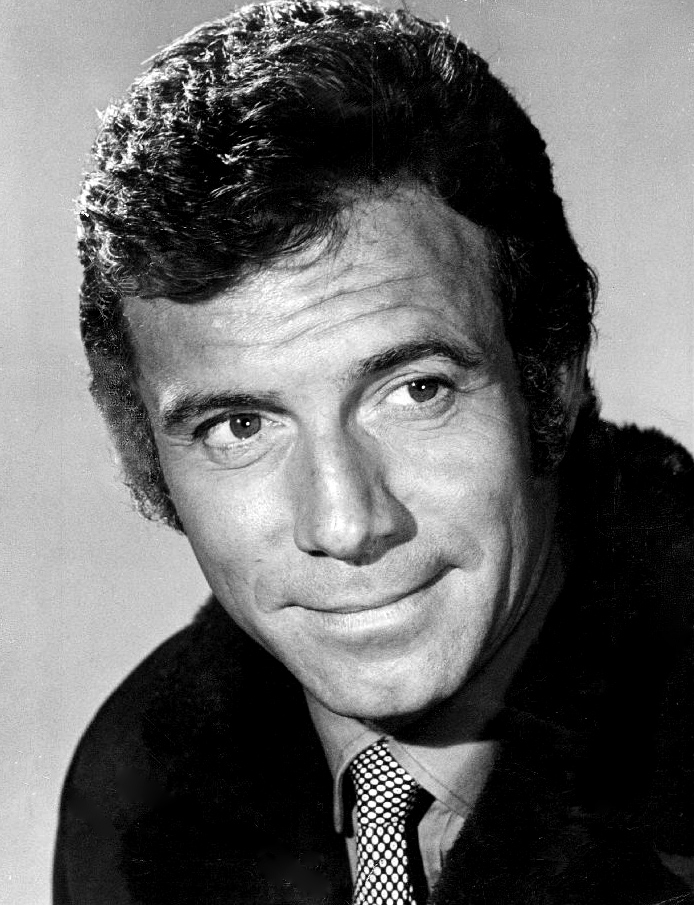
Anthony Franciosa

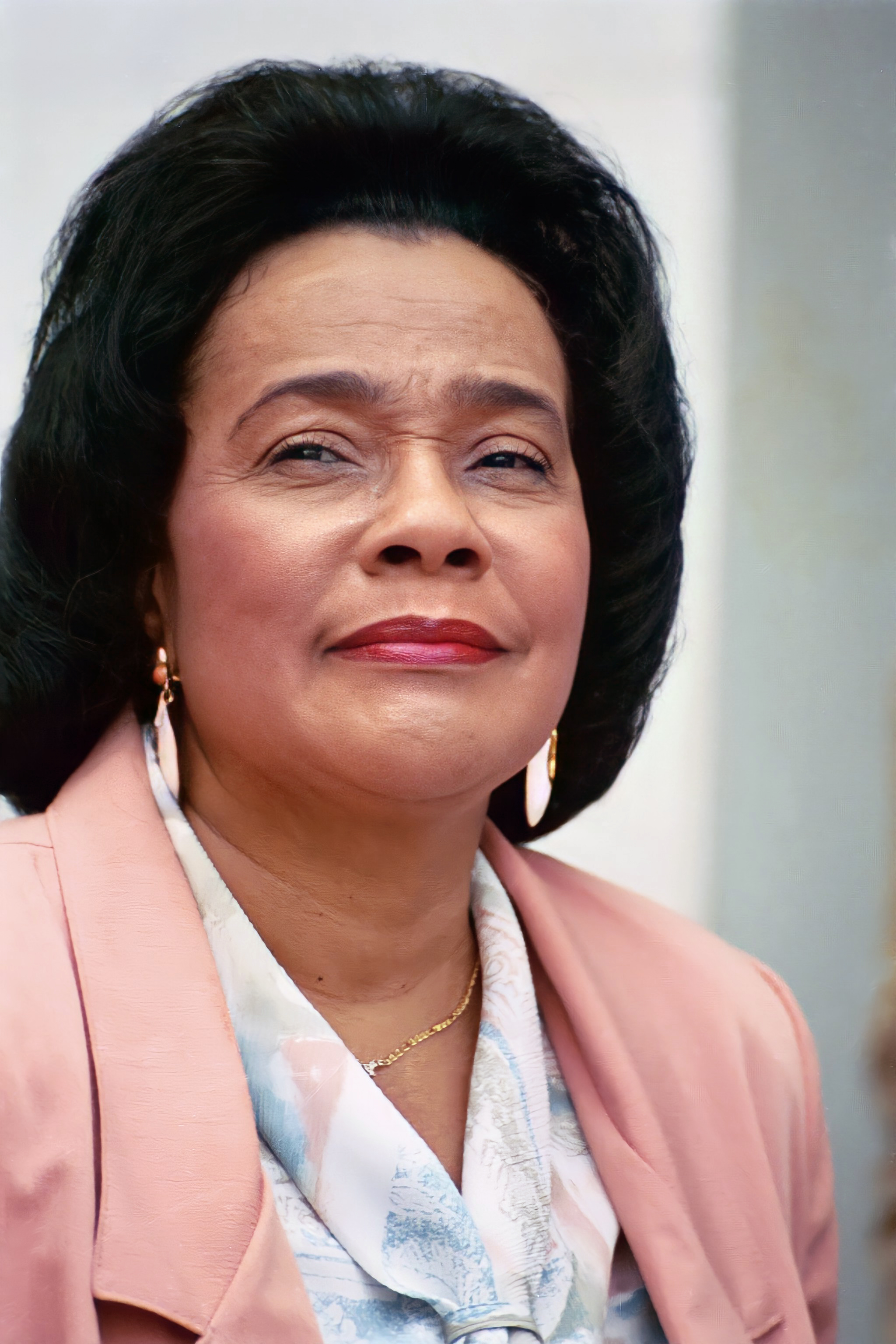
Coretta Scott King

- January 1
  - Harry Magdoff, economist, (b. 1913)
  - Gideon Rodan, Romanian-born American physician (b. 1934)
  - Hubert Schoemaker, Dutch-born American biochemist and executive (b. 1950)
- January 6
  - Lou Rawls, African-American singer, songwriter and actor (b. 1933)
  - Hugh Thompson, Jr., soldier and pilot (b. 1943)
- January 8 – David Rosenbaum, journalist (b. 1942)
- January 9
  - Elliot Forbes, conductor and musicologist (b. 1917)
  - W. Cleon Skousen, American conservative author and professor (b. 1913)
- January 10 – Ira Black, physician and neuroscientist (b. 1941)
- January 11
  - Nixzmary Brown, murder victim (b. 1998)
  - Eric Namesnik, swimmer (b. 1970)
- January 12
  - Eldon Dedini, cartoonist (b. 1921)
  - Anne Meacham, actress (b. 1925)
- January 14 – Shelley Winters, American actress (b. 1920)
- January 15 – Edward Hall, aeronautical engineer and brother of Theodore Hall (b. 1914)
- January 16 – Stanley Biber, surgeon (b. 1923)
- January 18 – Thomas Murphy, executive (b. 1915)
- January 19
  - Anthony Franciosa, American actor (b. 1928)
  - Wilson Pickett, singer and songwriter (b. 1941)
- January 23
  - David Weber, Lithuanian-born American musician (b. 1913)
  - Samuel Koster, general and murderer (b. 1919)
- January 24 – Chris Penn, actor and brother of Sean Penn (b. 1965)
- January 25 – Herbert Schilder, dental surgeon (b. 1929)
- January 28 – Helmut W. Schulz, German physicist and chemical engineer, died in White Plains, New York (b. 1912)
- January 30
  - Coretta Scott King, American civil rights activist (b. 1927)
  - Wendy Wasserstein, writer (b. 1950)
- January 31
  - George Koval, Soviet intelligence agent (b. 1913)
  - Paul Regina, actor (b. 1956)

=== February ===
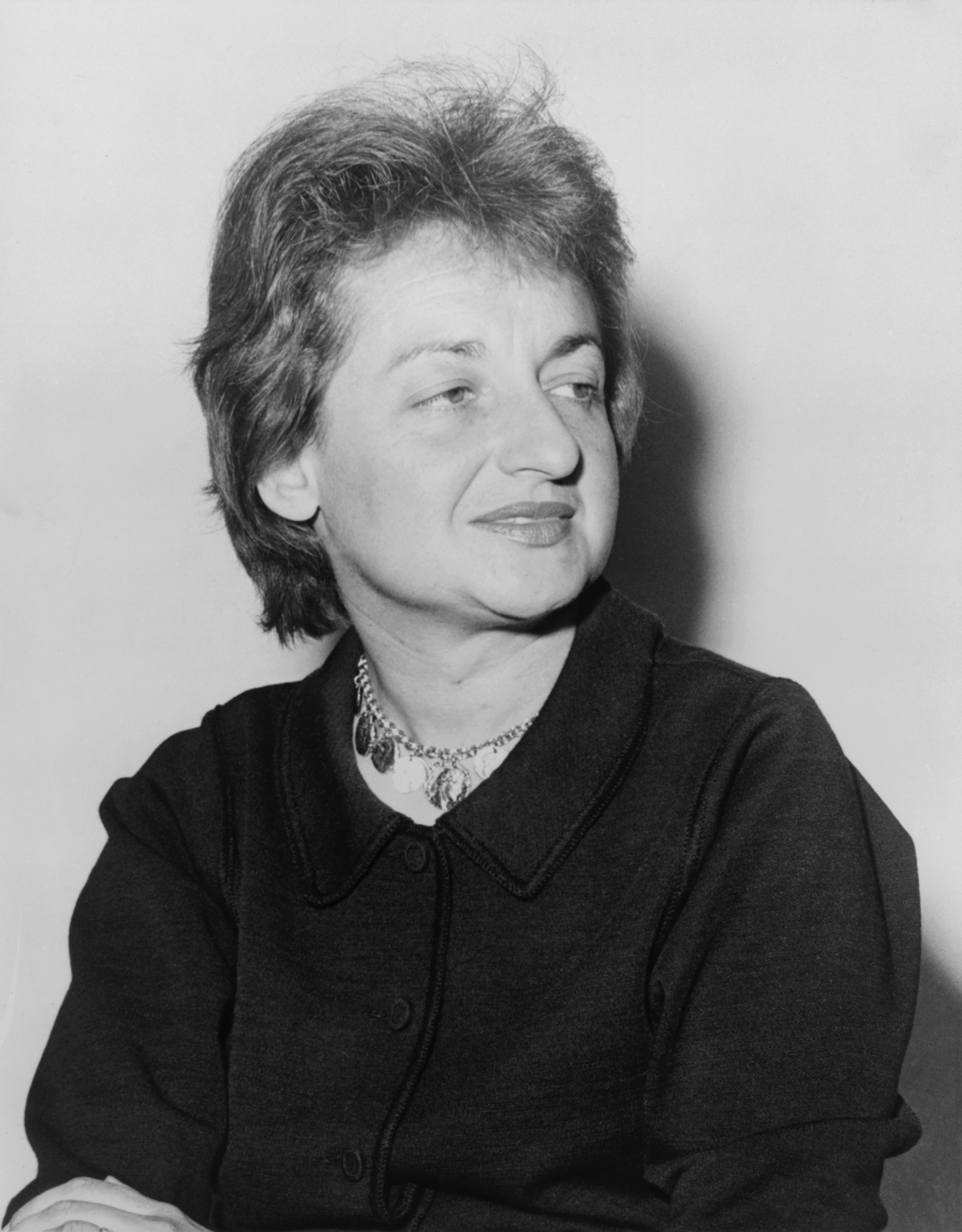
Betty Friedan

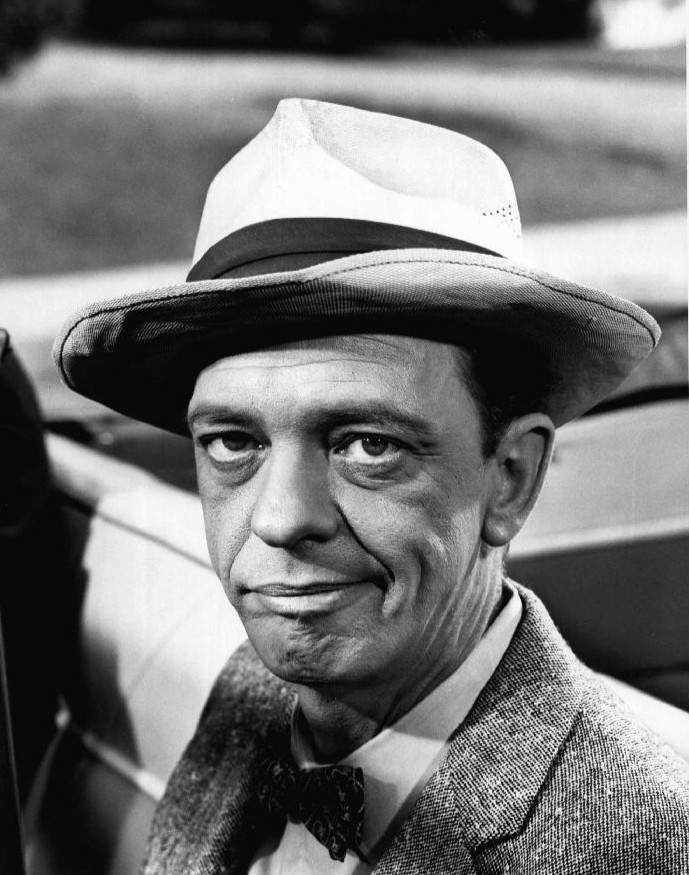
Don Knotts

- February 1 – Dick Brooks, auto racer (b. 1942)
- February 3
  - Lou Jones, track and field athlete (b. 1932)
  - Jean Byron, actress (b. 1925)
  - Al Lewis, American actor (b. 1923)
- February 4
  - Betty Friedan, American feminist, activist, and writer (b. 1921)
  - William Jones, minister and civil rights activist (b. 1934)
- February 5 – Franklin Cover, American actor (b. 1928)
- February 8 – Barry Martin, dancer, choreographer, and murder victim (b. 1962)
- February 10
  - J Dilla, American music producer (b. 1974)
  - Norman Shumway, surgeon (b. 1923)
  - John Belluso, writer (b. 1969)
- February 9 – Phil Brown, American actor (b. 1916)
- February 11 – Peter Benchley, writer (b. 1940)
- February 13 – Andreas Katsulas, American actor (b. 1946)
- February 18
  - Richard Bright, actor
  - Bill Cowsill, American musician, songwriter, and producer (b. 1948)
- February 20 – Curt Gowdy, sports announcer (b. 1919)
- February 24
  - Don Knotts, actor and comedian (b. 1924)
  - Dennis Weaver, actor (b. 1924)
- February 25 – Darren McGavin, actor (b. 1922)
- February 28 – Owen Chamberlain, American physicist and academic, Nobel Prize laureate (b. 1920)

=== March ===
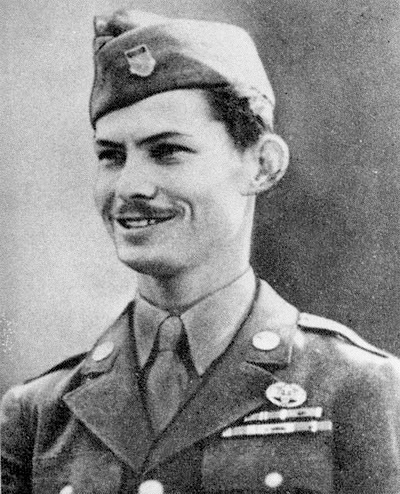
Desmond Doss

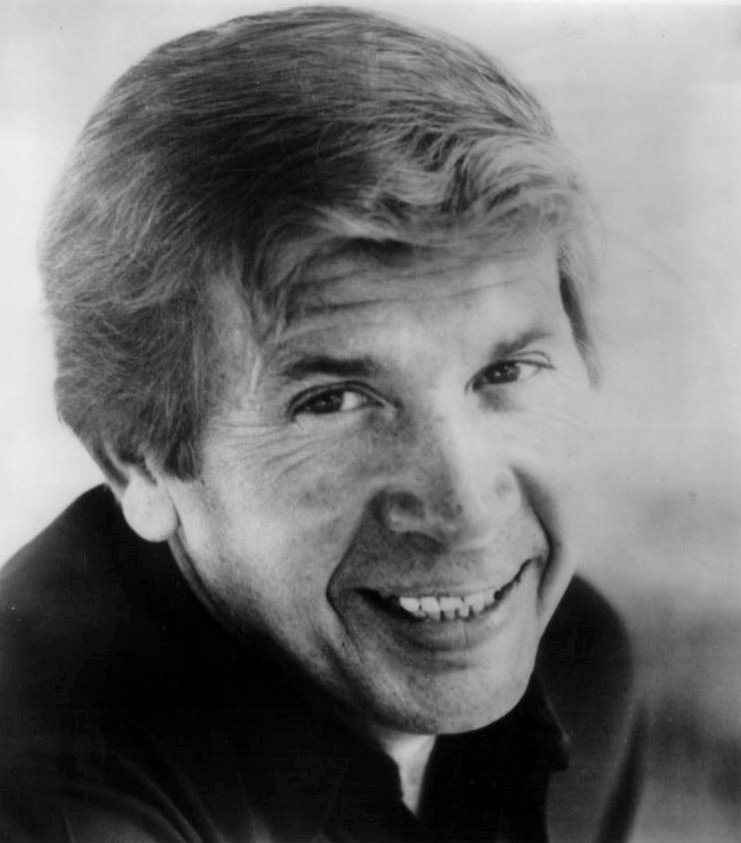
Buck Owens

- March 1 – Harry Browne, politician and author (b. 1933)
- March 2 – Phyllis Huffman, American casting director (b. 1944)
- March 5 – Richard Kuklinski, American hitman (b. 1935)
- March 6
  - Kirby Puckett, baseball player (b. 1960)
  - Dana Reeve, American actress (b. 1961)
- March 7 – Gordon Parks, American photographer (b. 1912)
- March 10
  - Anna Moffo, American soprano (b. 1932)
  - Ronald H. Nash, American philosopher (b. 1936)
- March 13
  - Peter Tomarken, American television personality and host (b. 1942)
  - Maureen Stapleton, American actress (b. 1925)
- March 17
  - Oleg Cassini, Russian-born fashion designer (b. 1913)
- March 18 – Bill Beutel, American reporter and journalist (b. 1930)
- March 21 – Bob Delegall, actor, director and producer (b. 1945)
- March 23 – Desmond Doss, combat medic (b. 1919)
- March 25
  - Richard Fleischer, film director (b. 1916)
  - Buck Owens, singer, bandleader, and TV host (b. 1929)
- March 26 – Paul Dana, racing driver (b. 1975)
- March 27 – Lyn Nofziger, American journalist, political consultant, and author (b. 1924)
- March 28
  - Jerry Brudos, murderer (b. 1939)
  - Charles Schepens, Belgium-born American ophthalmologist, surgeon, and insurgent (b. 1912)
  - Caspar Weinberger, 15th United States Secretary of Defense (b. 1917)
- March 29 – Don Alias, musician (b. 1939)
- March 30 – Philip Hyde, American wildlife photographer (b. 1921)
- March 31 – Jackie McLean, American jazz musician (b. 1931)

=== April ===
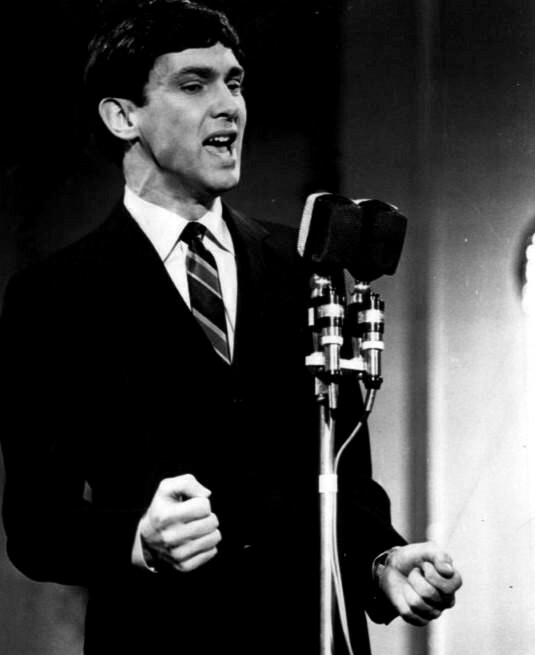
Gene Pitney

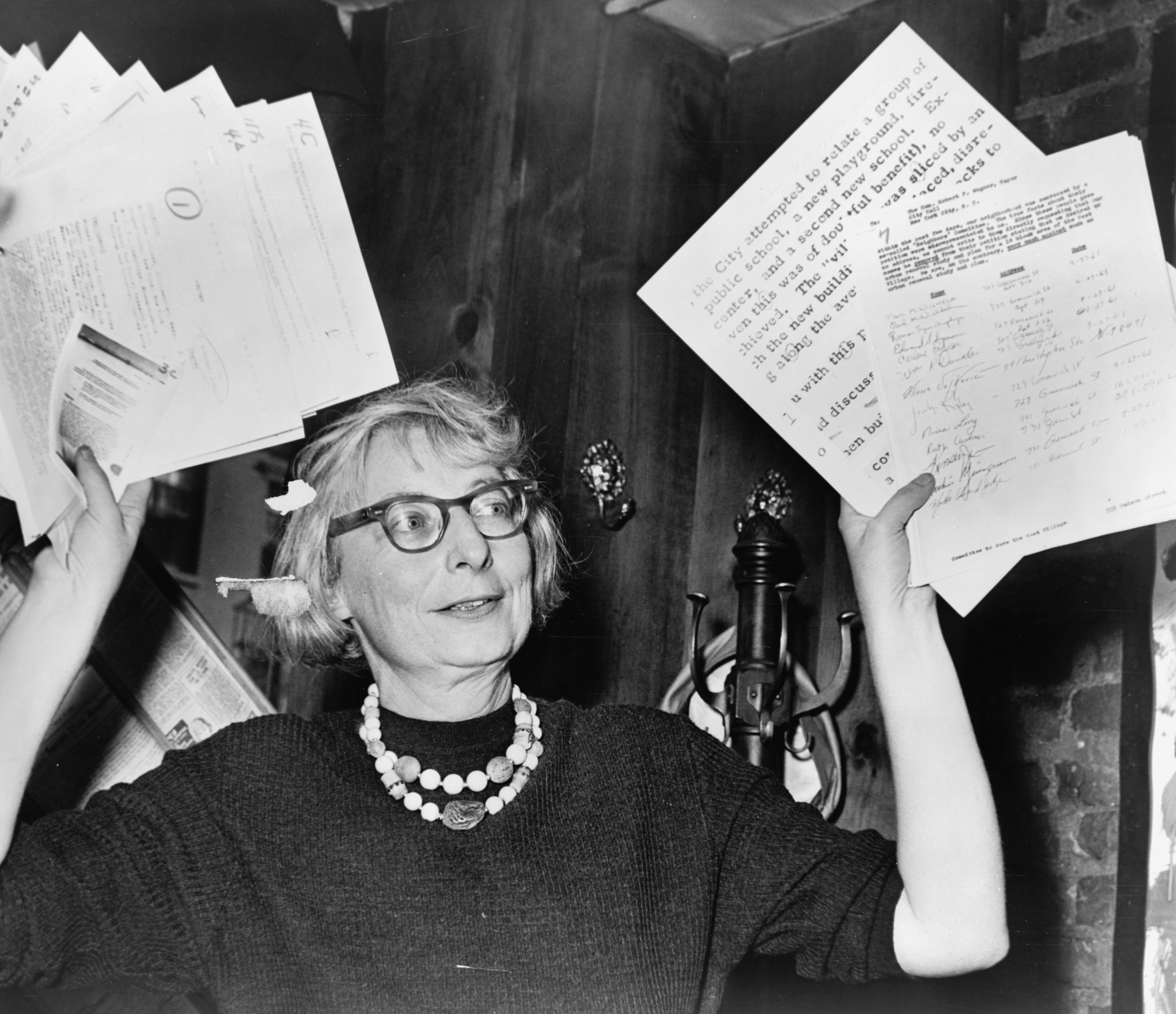
Jane Jacobs

- April 3
  - Marshall Goldberg, American football player (b. 1917)
  - Al Harker, American soccer player (b. 1910)
- April 4 – Fred J. Christensen, American fighter pilot (b. 1921)
- April 5 – Gene Pitney, singer (b. 1941)
- April 6 – Francis L. Kellogg, diplomat and socialite (b. 1917)
- April 9
  - Billy Hitchcock, American baseball player (b. 1916)
  - Jimmy Outlaw, American baseball player (b. 1913)
- April 11
  - June Pointer, American singer (b. 1953)
  - Proof, American rapper (D12) (b. 1973)
- April 15 – Louise Smith, American race car driver (b. 1916)
- April 16
  - Morton Freedgood, American author (b. 1913)
  - Daniel Schaefer, American politician (b. 1936)
- April 17
  - Scott Brazil, television producer and director (b. 1955)
  - Al Cederberg, American politician (b. 1918)
- April 19 – Bob Dove, American football player (b. 1921)
- April 24 – Sibby Sisti, American baseball player (b. 1920)
- April 25 – Jane Jacobs, American-born Canadian writer and activist (b. 1916)
- April 29 – Alberta Nelson, American actress (b. 1937)

=== May ===
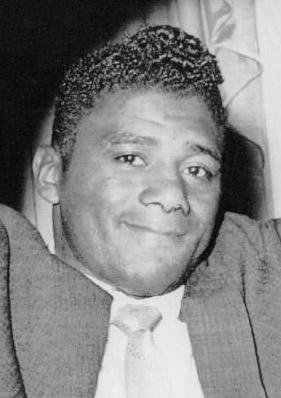
Floyd Patterson

- May 1 – Big Hawk, American rapper (b. 1969)
- May 2 – Louis Rukeyser, American financial journalist, commentator, and columnist (b. 1933)
- May 4 – Michael Taliferro, American actor (b. 1961)
- May 6 – Lillian Asplund, last American survivor of the RMS Titanic (b. 1906)
- May 10 – A. M. Rosenthal, Canadian-American journalist (b. 1922)
- May 11
  - Byron Morrow, American actor (b. 1911)
  - Floyd Patterson, American boxer (b. 1935)
- May 12 – Gillespie V. Montgomery, general and politician (b. 1920)
- May 13
  - Jaroslav Pelikan, historian (b. 1923)
  - Johnnie Wilder Jr., R&B singer (b. 1949)
- May 14
  - Lew Anderson, American actor and musician (b. 1922)
  - Robert Bruce Merrifield, biochemist and academic, Nobel Prize laureate (b. 1921)
- May 21 – Billy Walker, country musician (b. 1929)
- May 23 – Lloyd Bentsen, U.S. Senator from Texas from 1971 to 1993 (b. 1921)
- May 27 – Paul Gleason, actor (b. 1939)
- May 28 – Ramsay D. Potts, American air force general (b. 1916)
- May 29 – Steve Mizerak, American pool player (b. 1944)
- May 30 – Robert Sterling, American actor (b. 1917)
- May 31 – Raymond Davis Jr., chemist and physicist, Nobel Prize laureate (b. 1914)

=== June ===
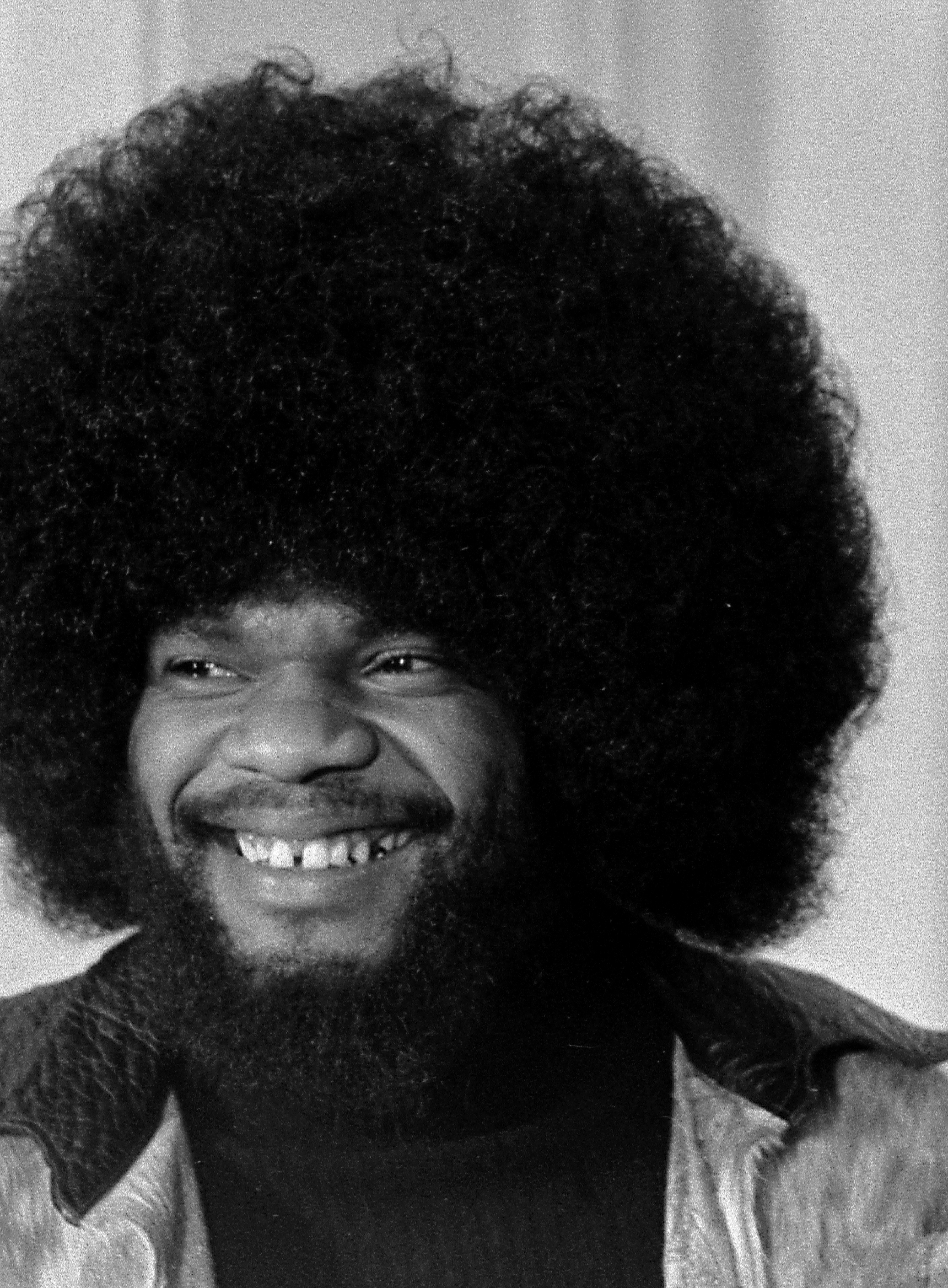
Billy Preston

- June 1 – William Winn, American psychologist (b. 1945)
- June 2 – Vince Welnick, American keyboardist (b. 1951)
- June 6
  - Billy Preston, American artist and musician (b. 1946)
  - Hilton Ruiz, American jazz pianist (b. 1952)
- June 7 – John Tenta, Canadian wrestler (b. 1963)
- June 8 – Robert Donner, American actor (b. 1931)
- June 11 – Michael Bartosh, engineer and businessman (b. 1977)
- June 13
  - Freddie Gorman, songwriter (b. 1939)
  - Luis Jiménez, sculptor (b. 1940)
- June 17 – Arthur Franz, American actor (b. 1920)
- June 18
  - Vincent Sherman, American movie director and actor (b. 1906)
  - Richard Stahl, American actor (b. 1932)
- June 20 – Bill Daniel, American politician (b. 1915)
- June 22 – Moose, canine actor (b. 1990)
- June 23 – Aaron Spelling, television producer (b. 1923)
- June 24 – Patsy Ramsey, American beauty pageant winner and mother of JonBenét Ramsey (b. 1956)
- June 25
  - George W. Clarke, Washington State politician (b. 1906)
  - Arif Mardin, Turkish-American music producer (b. 1932)
- June 27 – Eileen Barton, singer (b. 1924) .

=== July ===
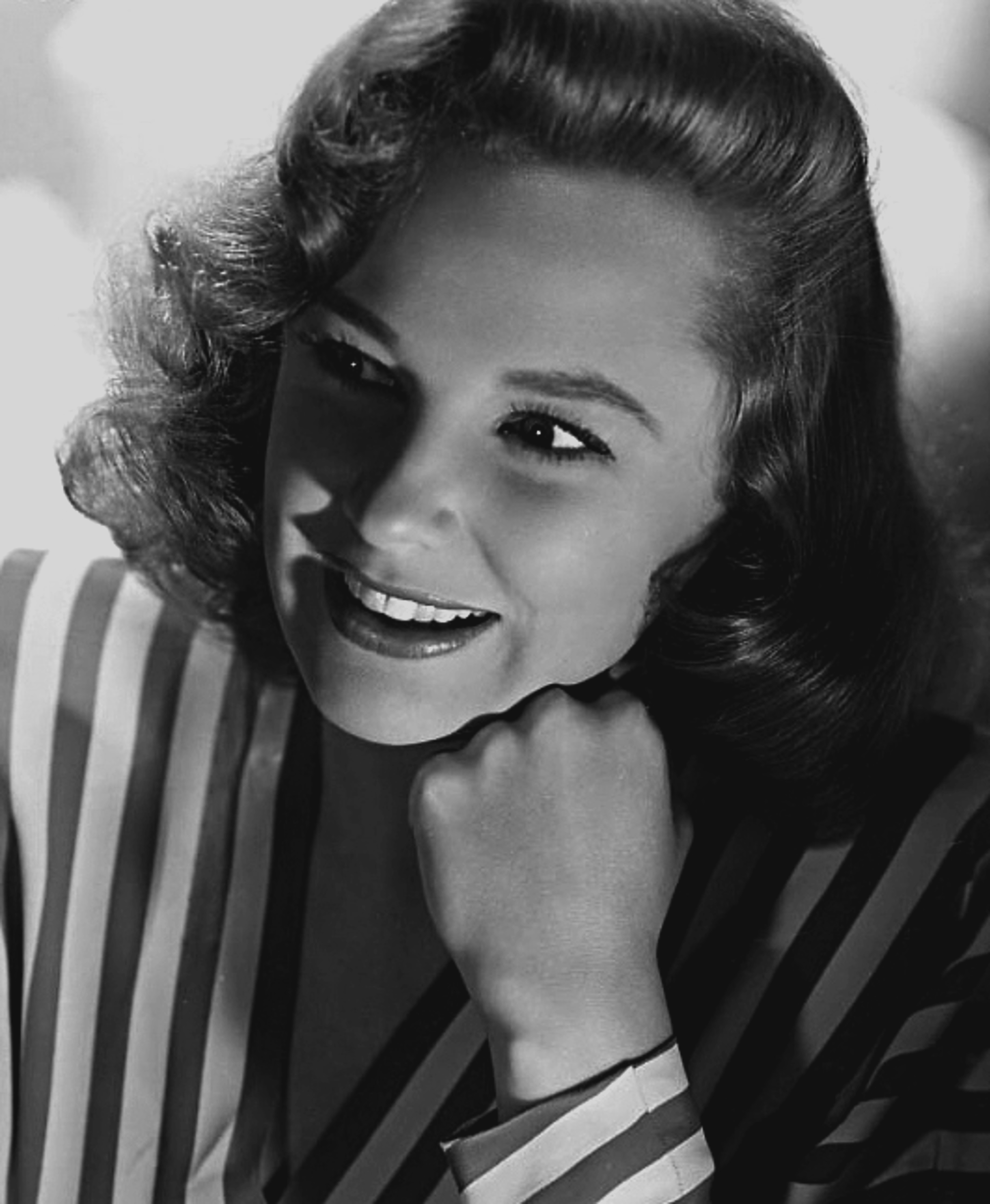
June Allyson

- July 2 – Jan Murray, comedian, actor, and host (b. 1916)
- July 3 – Benjamin Hendrickson, actor (b. 1950)
- July 5 – Kenneth Lay, businessman (b. 1942)
- July 6 – Kasey Rogers, American actress and writer (b. 1925)
- July 7
  - Reinhold O. Carlson, politician (b. 1905)
  - John Money, New Zealand psychologist, sexologist and author (b. 1921)
- July 8 – June Allyson, actress (b. 1917)
- July 11 – Barnard Hughes, American actor (b. 1915)
- July 13 – Red Buttons, actor and comedian (b. 1919)
- July 14 – Carrie Nye, American actress (b. 1936)
- July 16
  - Destiny Norton, murder victim (b. 2000)
  - Winthrop Paul Rockefeller, politician (b. 1948)
- July 17 – Mickey Spillane, writer (b. 1918)
- July 19 – Jack Warden, actor (b. 1920)
- July 21
  - Mako, Japanese-American actor and singer (b. 1933)
  - J. Madison Wright Morris, actress (b. 1984)
- July 30 – Murray Bookchin, American libertarian socialist (b. 1921)

=== August ===
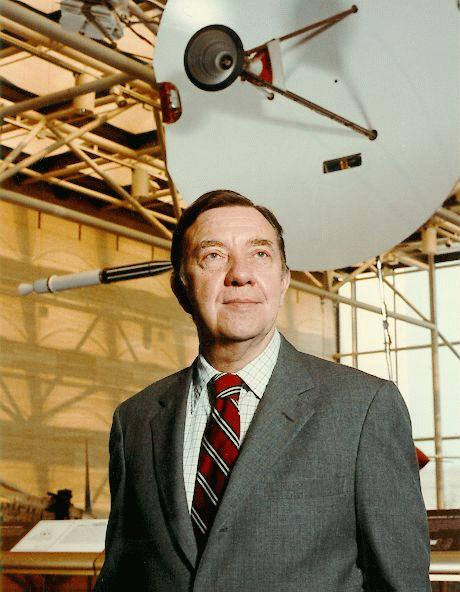
James Van Allen

- August 1 – Rufus Harley, jazz musician (b. 1936)
- August 3 – Arthur Lee, musician (b. 1945)
- August 6 – Marcus Fiesel, murder victim (b. 2003)
- August 9 – James Van Allen, physicist (b. 1914)
- August 11 – Mike Douglas, talk show host and actor (b. 1920)
- August 13 – Tony Jay, English-American actor and voice artist (b. 1933)
- August 14 – Bruno Kirby, American actor (b. 1949)
- August 16 – Herschel Green, fighter pilot (b. 1920)
- August 20 – Joe Rosenthal, photographer (b. 1911)
- August 21
  - John Hulett, African American civil rights activist (b. 1927)
  - William Norris, business executive (b. 1911)
- August 23 – Ed Warren, paranormal investigator and author (b. 1926)
- August 28
  - Norman Hitchcock, pool and billiards player (b. 1929)
  - Melvin Schwartz, Nobel-winning physicist (b. 1932)
- August 30 – Glenn Ford, Canadian actor (b. 1916)

=== September ===
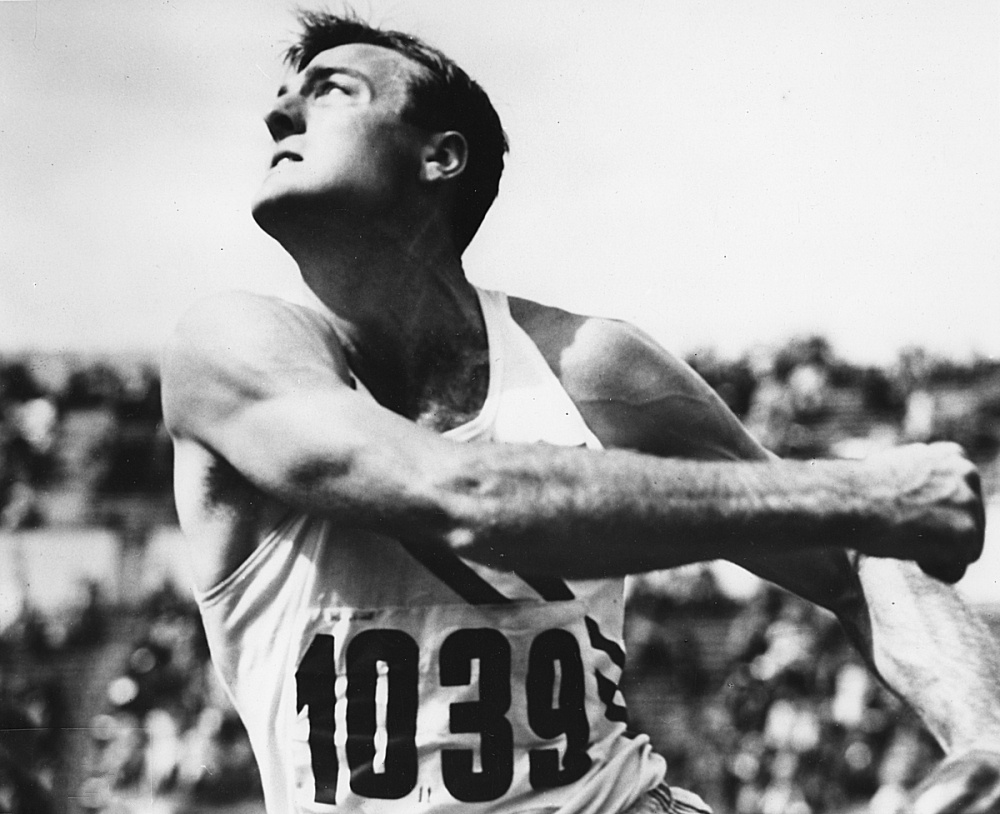
Bob Mathias

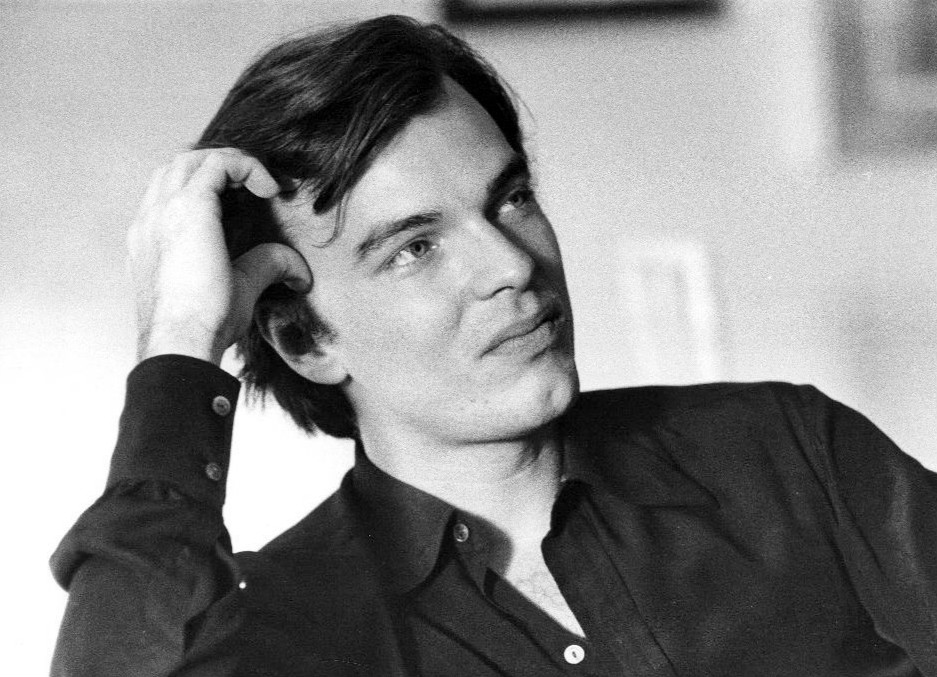
Edward Albert

- September 1 – Nellie Connally, American socialite (b. 1919)
- September 2 – Bob Mathias, American athlete (b. 1930)
- September 7 – Robert Earl Jones, American actor and boxer (b. 1910)
- September 9 – Herbert Rudley, American actor (b. 1910)
- September 10
  - Jane Hope Hastings (Katherine Kelenen), stage actress (b. 1902)
  - Daniel Wayne Smith, American actor (b. 1986)
- September 11 – Pat Corley, American actor (b. 1930)
- September 13 – Ann Richards, 45th Governor of Texas (1991–1995) (b. 1933)
- September 14 – Mickey Hargitay, Hungarian-American actor and bodybuilder (b. 1926)
- September 17 – Patricia Kennedy Lawford, American socialite (b. 1924)
- September 22 – Edward Albert, American actor (b. 1951)
- September 23 – Etta Baker, American piedmont blues guitarist (b. 1913)
- September 24 – Henry Townsend, American blues musician (b. 1909)
- September 26
  - Byron Nelson, American golfer (b. 1912)
  - Iva Toguri D'Aquino, American propagandist for Japan in World War II (b. 1916)
- September 30 – Josh Graves, American bluegrass musician (b. 1927)

=== October ===
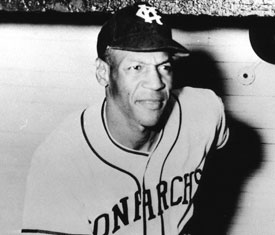
Buck O'Neil

- October 2
  - Frances Bergen, American actress (b. 1922)
  - Tamara Dobson, American actress (b. 1947)
- October 5 – George King, American basketball player and coach (b. 1928)
- October 6 – Buck O'Neil, American baseball player and manager (b. 1911)
- October 7 – Anna Politkovskaya, American-born Russian journalist (b. 1958)
- October 9 – Glenn Myernick, American soccer player and coach (b. 1954)
- October 11 – Cory Lidle, American baseball player (b. 1972)
- October 13 – Hilda Terry, American cartoonist (b. 1914)
- October 14
  - Freddy Fender, American singer (b. 1937)
  - Gerry Studds, American politician (b. 1937)
- October 17 – Megan Meier, American victim of cyber bullying (b. 1992)
- October 18
  - Don R. Christensen, American animator and cartoonist. (b.1916)
  - Alvin Weinberg, American nuclear physicist (b. 1915)
- October 19 – Phyllis Kirk, American actress (b. 1927)
- October 20 – Jane Wyatt, actress (b. 1910)
- October 21 – Sandy West, rock musician, former member of The Runaways (b. 1959)
- October 22 – Arthur Hill, Canadian actor (b. 1922)
- October 24 – Enolia McMillan, American civil rights activist (b. 1904)
- October 27
  - Joe Niekro, American baseball player (b. 1944)
  - Brad Will, American activist (b. 1970)
- October 28 – Red Auerbach, basketball coach and official (b. 1917)
- October 29 – Silas Simmons, Pre-Negro league baseball player, longest-lived professional baseball player (b. 1895)
- October 30 – Clifford Geertz, American anthropologist (b. 1926)

=== November ===
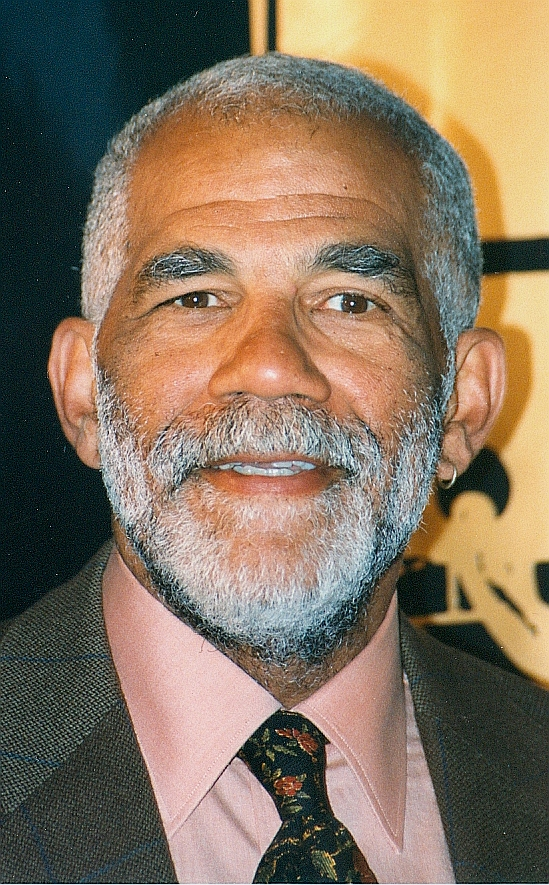
Ed Bradley

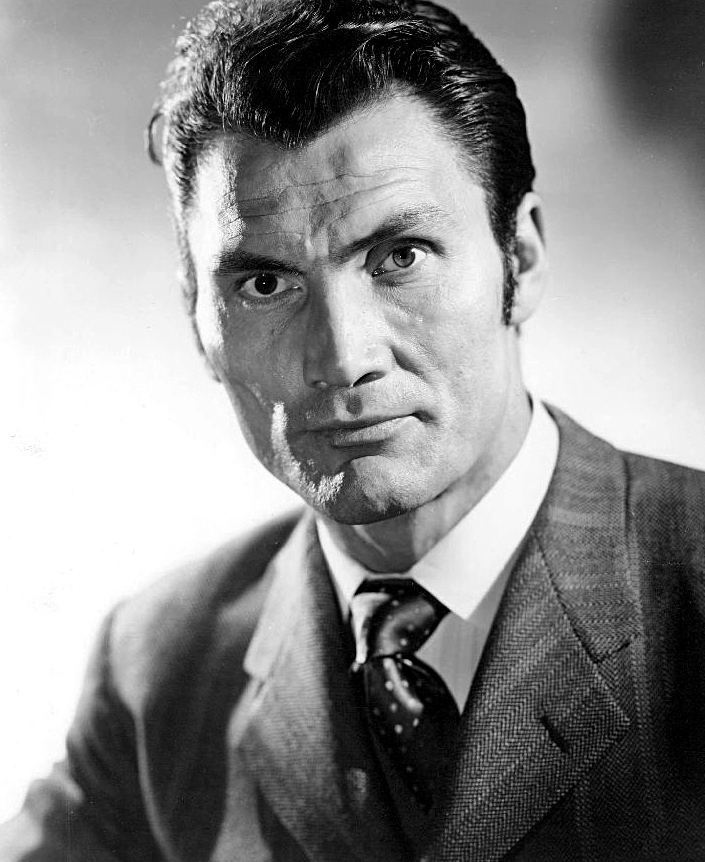
Jack Palance

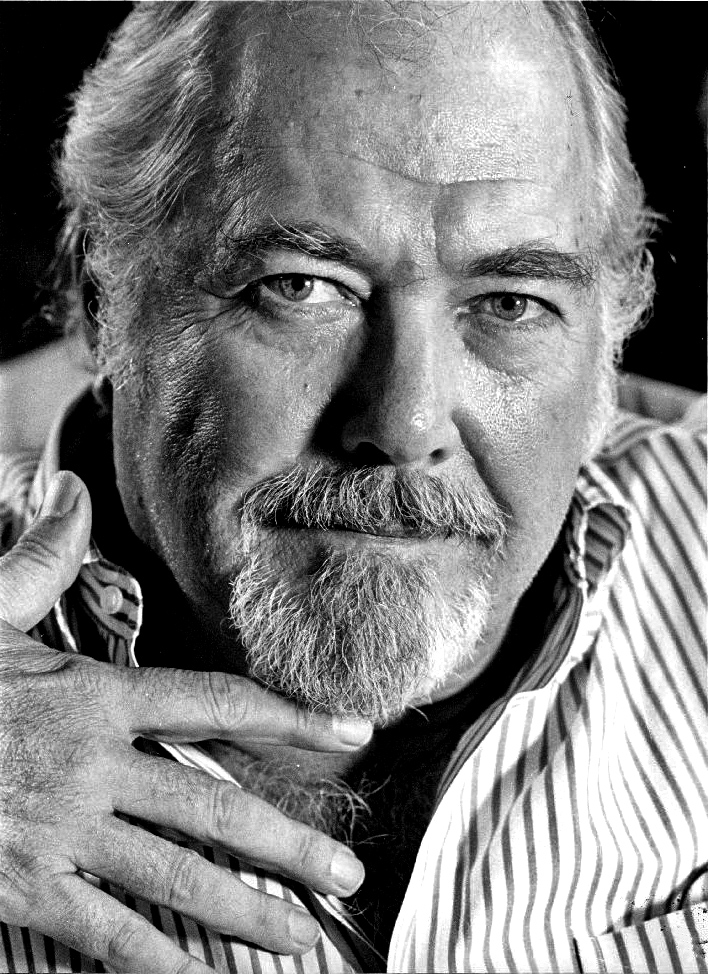
Robert Altman

- November 1
  - Adrienne Shelly, actress & director (b. 1966)
  - William Styron, writer (b. 1925)
- November 2
  - Red Hayworth, American baseball player (b. 1916)
  - Carroll Knicely, American publisher (b. 1929)
  - Leonard Schrader, American screenwriter (b. 1943)
- November 3
  - Belden Bly, American teacher (b. 1914)
  - Sputnik Monroe, American professional wrestler (b. 1928)
- November 4
  - Nelson S. Bond, American writer (b. 1908)
  - William Lee Brent, American Black Panther Party member (b. 1931)
- November 5 – Samuel Bowers, American Ku Klux Klansman and convicted killer (b. 1924)
- November 7 – Johnny Sain, American baseball player (b. 1917)
- November 8 – Basil Poledouris, American composer (b. 1945)
- November 9 – Ed Bradley, African-American journalist (b. 1941)
- November 10
  - Gerald Levert, American singer, songwriter, and producer (b. 1966)
  - Jack Palance, American actor (b. 1919)
- November 14
  - Sumner Shapiro, American admiral (b.1926)
  - Pete Suder, American baseball player (b. 1916)
- November 16 – Milton Friedman, American Nobel economist (b. 1912)
- November 17
  - Ruth Brown, American singer (b. 1928)
  - Bo Schembechler, American college football player, coach, and athletic administrator (b. 1929)
- November 19 – Jeremy Slate, American actor and songwriter (b. 1926)
- November 20
  - Robert Altman, American film director (b. 1925)
  - Andre Waters, American football player and coach (b. 1962)
- November 21 – Robert Lockwood Jr., American musician (b. 1915)
- November 23
  - Anita O'Day, American singer (b. 1919)
  - Willie Pep, American boxer (b. 1922)
- November 24 – Walter Booker, American jazz bassist (b. 1933)
- November 25 – Kenneth M. Taylor, American pilot (b. 1919)
- November 26 – Dave Cockrum, American comic book artist (b. 1943)
- November 29 – Emmett Kelly Jr. American clown (b. 1924)
- November 30 – Shirley Walker, composer and conductor for film and television (b. 1945)

=== December ===
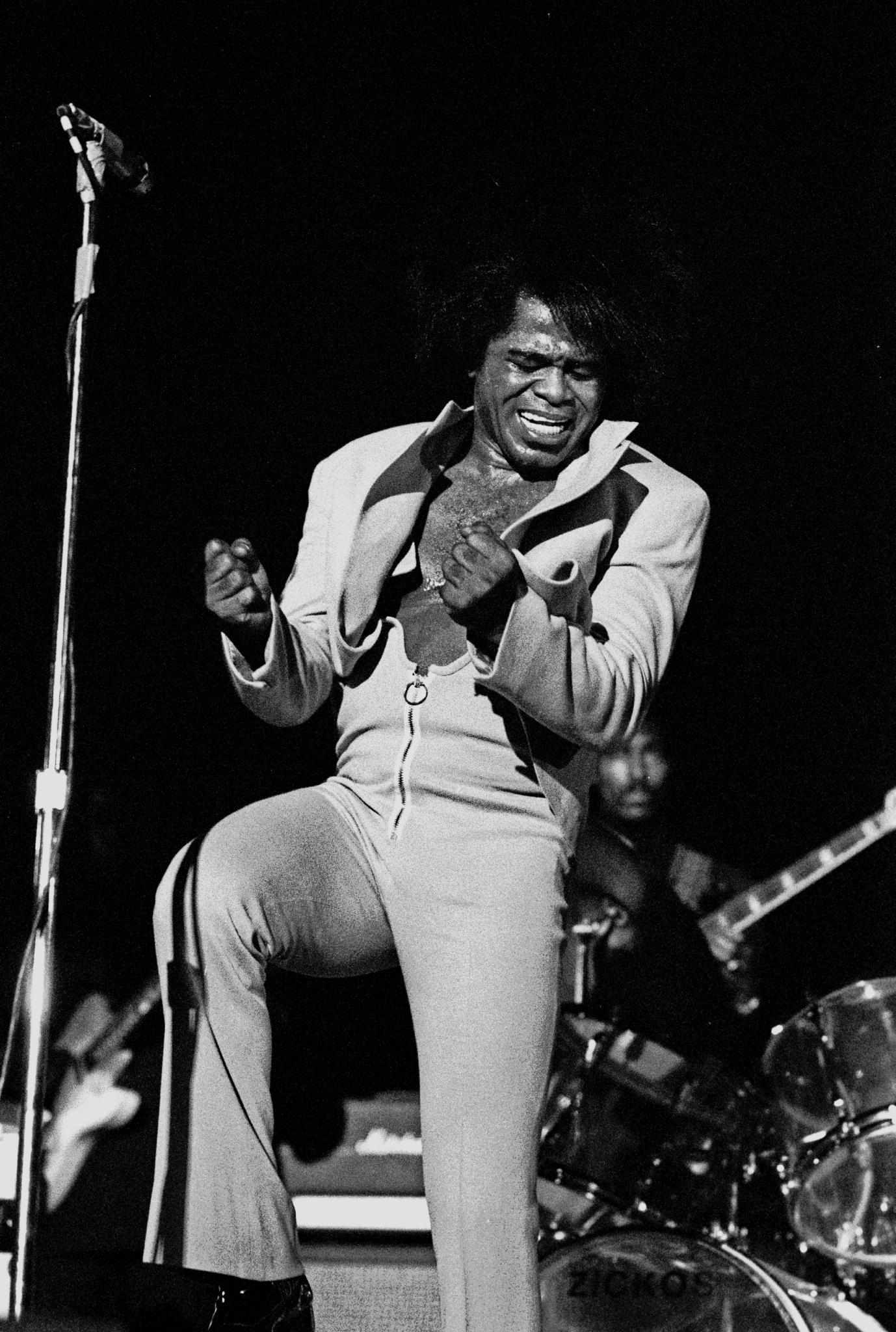
James Brown

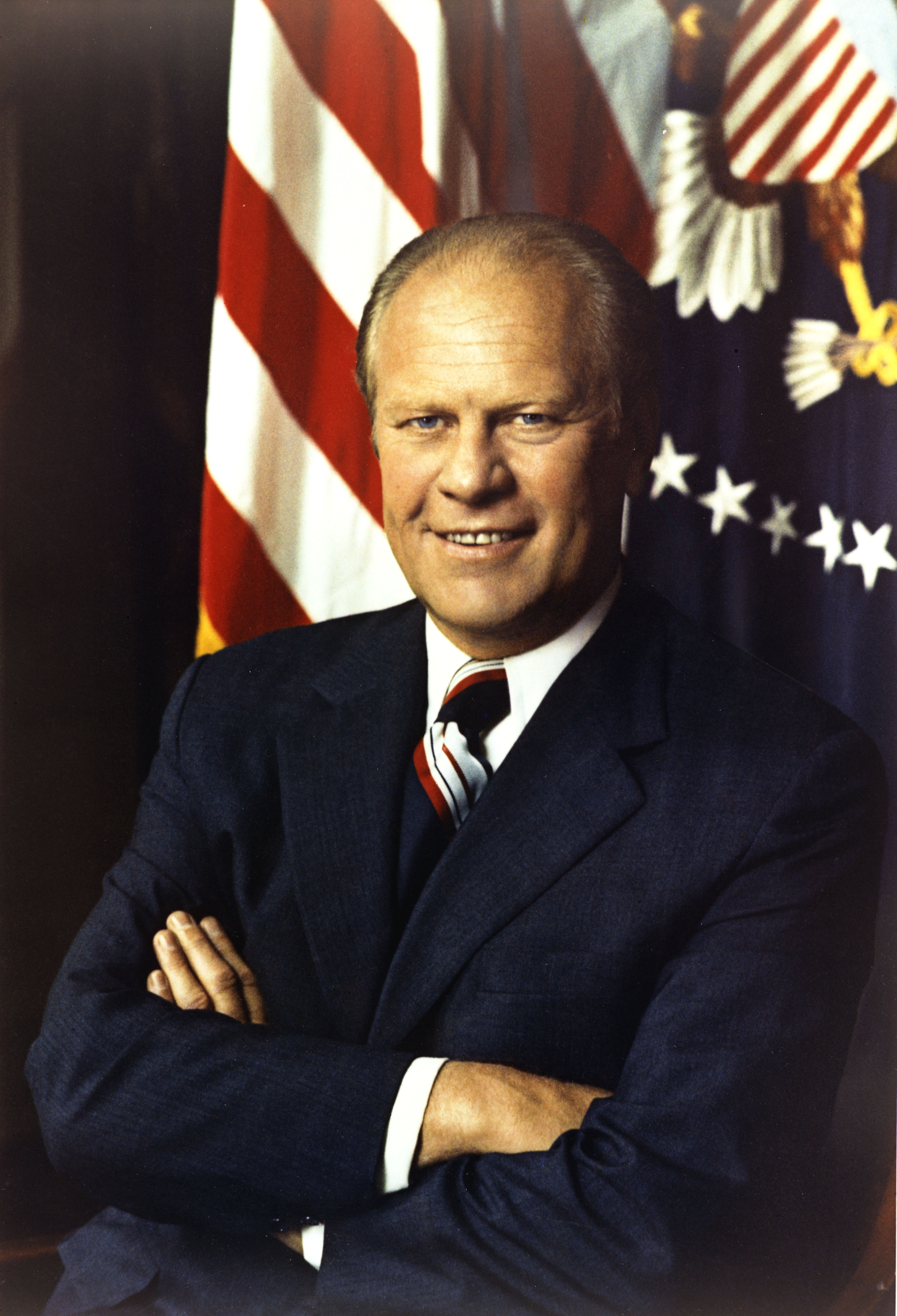
Gerald Ford

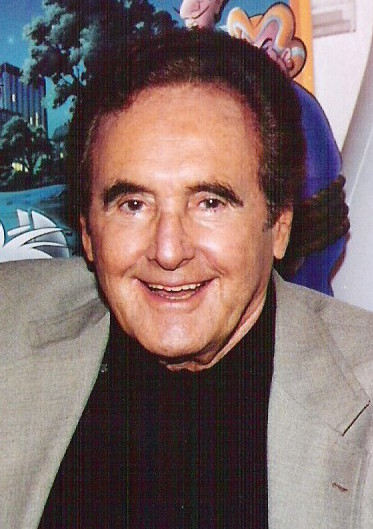
Joseph Barbera

- December 2 – Kari Edwards, poet (b. 1954)
- December 3 – Logan Whitehurst, musician (b. 1977)
- December 7 – Jeane Kirkpatrick, political theorist and U.N. ambassador (b. 1926)
- December 8 – Martha Tilton, singer (b. 1915)
- December 9 – Georgia Gibbs, singer (b. 1919)
- December 11 – Elizabeth Bolden, supercentenarian (b. 1890)
- December 12
  - Paul Arizin, basketball player (b. 1928)
  - Peter Boyle, actor (b. 1935)
  - Ellis Rubin, attorney and author (b. 1925)
  - Raymond P. Shafer, politician (b. 1917)
- December 13
  - Lamar Hunt, sports executive (b. 1932)
  - Homesick James, blues musician (b. 1910)
  - Rebecca Riley, murder victim (b. 2002)
- December 14 – Mike Evans, American actor (b. 1949)
- December 16 – Marjorie F. Lambert, archaeologist and anthropologist (b. 1908)
- December 17 – Timmie Rogers, actor and singer-songwriter (b. 1915)
- December 18 – Joseph Barbera, cartoonist (b. 1911)
- December 25 – James Brown, American musician (b. 1933)
- December 26 – Gerald Ford, 38th President of the United States (1974–1977) (b. 1913)
- December 29 – Red Wolf, American bucking bull (b. 1988)
- December 31 – Seymour Martin Lipset, American sociologist (b. 1922)

== See also ==
- 2006 in American soccer
- 2006 in American television
- List of American films of 2006
- Timeline of United States history (1990–2009)
