= Fair Trade Towns USA =

Fair Trade Towns USA is an organization that encourages towns and cities across the United States to adopt a commitment to fair trade in their communities.

== Overview ==
This organization seeks to accomplish this goal by raising awareness about fair trade and social and economic justice. Its purpose is to provide opportunities for producers in developing countries to earn a living wage. Such opportunities generally come in the form of direct market access and fair prices for their products. Fair Trade Towns USA aims to join consumers, activists, socially responsible businesses and retailers, faith-based groups, and local government in its promotion of fair trade communities. The organization awards the Fair Trade Town status to cities and towns that meet certain criteria. They provide guidelines for meeting these criteria and offer informational resources that are designed to help community leaders accumulate local support.

== History ==
The history of fair trade in the United States began in the 1990s, when the use of fair trade labels was introduced to help visually distinguish products. Fairtrade Labelling Organizations International (FLO) was formed to set fair trade prices, and TransFair USA took the lead in the U.S. Its labeling efforts contributed to an average annual growth in the sale of fair trade coffee in the U.S. reaching 79% in 1999. Then, throughout the early 2000s, major chains in the U.S. such as Starbucks and Wal-Mart begin selling fair trade products. Fair trade sales in the U.S. averaged an annual growth of 50% throughout the decade.

Following the proliferation of Fairtrade Towns in the UK, Media, Pennsylvania became the first fair trade town in the U.S. in 2006. Today there are 45 U.S. Fair Trade Towns in total. Below is a list of these towns as of November 2019.

- Alexandria, VA (2014)
- Amherst, MA (2007)
- Ballston Spa, NY (2008)
- Berkeley, CA (2010)
- Bloomington, IN (2013)
- Bluffton, OH (2009)
- Boston, MA (2010)
- Brattleboro, VT (2007)
- Buena Vista, CO (2010)
- Burlington, VT (2007)
- Chapel Hill, NC (2012)
- Chelsea, MI (2014)
- Chicago, IL (2011)
- Chico, CA (2009)
- Claremont, CA (2012)
- Cleveland Heights, OH (2015)
- Conway, MA (2010)
- Dayton, OH (2013)
- Fond du Lac, WI (2013)
- Greenwich, CT (2010)
- Healdsburg, CA (2011)
- Highland Park, NJ (2009)
- Houston, TX (2017)
- La Mesa, CA (2012)
- Lawrence, KS (2015)
- Madison, WI (2010)
- Mankato, MN (2011)
- Media, PA (2006)
- Milwaukee, WI (2007)
- Montclair, NJ (2008)
- Norman, OK (2010)
- Northampton, MA (2008)
- Olympia, WA (2015)
- Overland Park, KS (2015)
- Pasadena, CA (2013)
- Philadelphia, PA (2015)
- Red Bank, NJ (2010)
- San Francisco, CA (2008)
- San Ramon, CA (2014)
- Santa Rosa, CA (2015)
- State College, PA (2015)
- Taos, NM (2008)
- Teaneck, NJ (2010)
- Winter Park, FL (2012)

There are also forty-three cities across the U.S. that had fair trade campaigns in progress as of 2019.

== Criteria ==
In order to be officially recognized by Fair Trade Towns USA, a town must submit an application and demonstrate that it has met the following criteria:

- A diverse steering committee has been formed that represents different aspects of the community and helps make decisions for the town's movement.
- Retailers have been participating in the movement by offering fair trade products.
- Support has been grown within the community and a diverse base of supporters has been demonstrated.
- Media recognition has been gained in order to help raise community awareness.
- The local government has passed a resolution to support fair trade.

== Motivations ==
Although U.S. interest in fair trade has lagged behind that in the UK, the movement has continued to grow. Scholars of consumer behaviour have studied reasons for its growth in popularity. They suggest that Fair Trade Towns USA and other fair trade organizations have successfully capitalized on what is known as ethical consumption. Promotion of ethical products in recent years has transitioned from niche areas to mainstream markets. Business and consumers are attracted to idea of ethical production and consumption because it allows individuals to feel like they have made a difference with little pain or effort.

Fair Trade Towns USA seeks to motivates people to buy fair trade products by describing the benefits to producers and their families in developing countries. According to their website, money spent on fair trade products pays for children's school fees, better nutrition, and health care. Being able to afford these basic things empowers those who would otherwise suffer in poverty. Fair Trade Towns USA also promotes ethical consumption by requiring that producers in these developing countries employ an environmental awareness in the production of their goods.

== Challenges ==
Although the number of fair trade towns is increasing, the task of becoming one is not without its challenges. Much of the enthusiasm within communities to become a fair trade town is stimulated by grassroots efforts. However, most towns depend on free publicity to raise awareness. The criteria are largely met through the work of volunteers and fundraisers, especially in the initial stages. Fair Trade Towns USA offers resources on their website designed to help communities in their efforts. A few of these resources include sample campaign petition forms, community outreach letters, and press release examples. Fair trade towns are also encouraged to form partnerships with other networks within their communities such as religious organizations and environmental groups.

Other cities have also experienced lack of support for fair trade as a challenge. For example, before it was certified in late 2011, Mankato, MN found that it was more difficult than they expected to convince their City Council to pass a fair trade resolution. One city leader there said "In the political environment, there are those who say this is not the council's business."
