= Fight Forever Foundation =

American non-profit organization

- Founded: 2006
- Founder: Danny Ferrone
- Purpose: Cystic fibrosis
- Location: Park Ridge, Illinois
- Region served: Worldwide
- Website: fightforever.org

The Fight Forever Foundation is a 501(c)(3) non-profit foundation founded to find a cure for cystic fibrosis (CF), a life-threatening, genetic lung disease affecting 100,000 people worldwide. This objective is expressed in both Danny's personal mission and the shared mission of the Foundation, "Find a Cure or Die Trying." To accomplish this mission the Foundation continues to build their International Medical Advisory Board to collectively stay abreast of the evolving advancements being made for a cure, while simultaneously raising funds, to effectively support promising advancements.

== History ==
Danny Ferrone was diagnosed with cystic fibrosis at the age of two. After three and a half years weathering the harsh winters and high altitude of Colorado while a student at the University of Denver, Ferrone returned home to Chicago to focus on his health. While training for the 2006 Accenture Triathlon, Ferrone came up with the idea to create the Fight Forever Foundation. Founded by Ferrone and two of his close friends, the Foundation's immediate fundraising efforts were centered on a campaign which involved Ferrone competing in triathlon and marathon events which were supposed to culminate in the Ironman World Championship in Kona, Hawaii, in 2008. Danny, with his limited lung capacity around 50%, finished marathons in Las Vegas, Los Angeles, and Chicago, and the Accenture Triathlon in Chicago, twice, over the two-year campaign. However, his goal of qualifying for the Ironman World Championship fell short after a hard-fought performance at the qualifying Buffalo Springs Lake triathlon event in Lubbock, Texas, in June 2008, where his time of 5 hours, 48 minutes failed to land him a spot in Kona.

== Current projects ==
Ferrone is currently in Milan, Italy, working together with the Italian Cystic Fibrosis Research Foundation and researchers throughout Europe, while continuing his training to compete in more marathons and triathlons. He regularly speaks internationally at seminars for both researchers and people living with CF where he discusses the "Battle" he faces on a daily basis, and provides support to families and individuals also battling the disease.

== See also ==
- Cystic Fibrosis
- List of cystic fibrosis organizations
- Canadian Cystic Fibrosis Foundation
