= Mangroomer =

Device for shaving back hair

The Mangroomer is a product that men can use to shave their own back hair.

The device was invented by Brett Marut, a resident of Santa Monica, California, after he suffered from pain and embarrassment while having his back professionally waxed at a salon full of female customers. It first went on sale in 2006 and quickly gained popularity through online retailers. The Mangroomer is an electric razor which The New York Times remarked "resembles a futuristic kung fu weapon." When it is folded open and its telescoping handle is extended to its maximum length, the Mangroomer is almost two feet long.
