= Donald P. Kanak =

American non-executive chairman

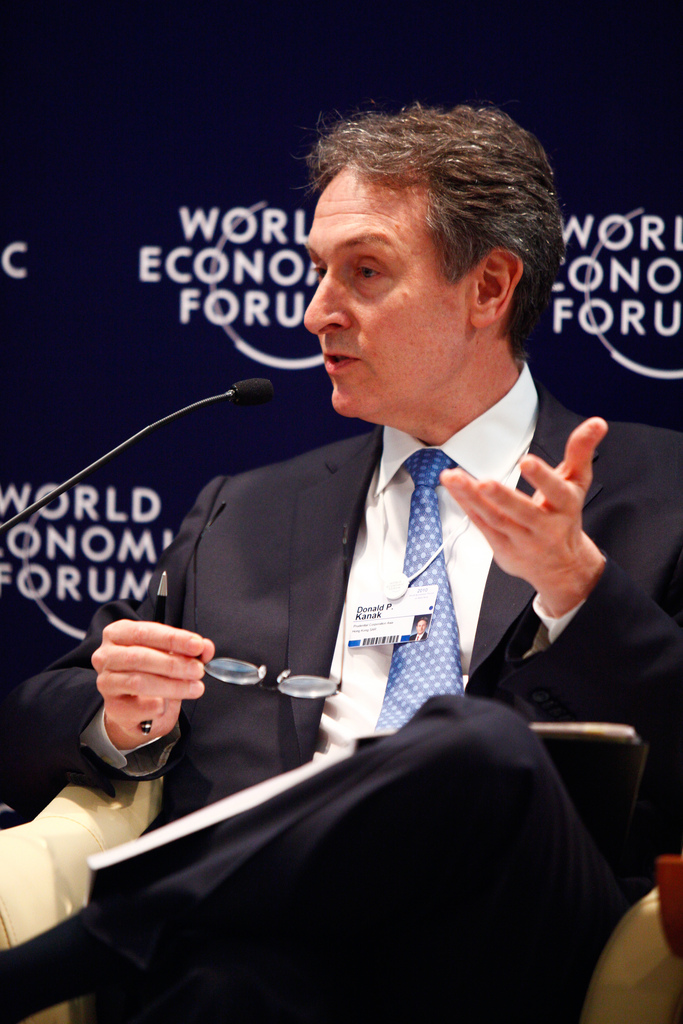
Kanak at the World Economic Forum on East Asia

Donald P. Kanak is non-executive chairman of Prudential Corporation Asia, the Asian division of Prudential plc. Until 2006 he was a senior executive at American International Group, and was at one time considered to succeed Hank Greenberg as CEO.

== Career ==
=== Financial services ===
After beginning his career in management consulting, Kanak entered the insurance and financial services industry in 1986. He joined AIG in 1992 and held various executive positions in Asia and the United States, including CEO of AIG Companies in Japan and Korea. When he left AIG in 2006, Kanak was executive vice chairman and chief operating officer. Since 2008, he has been chairman of Prudential Corporation Asia, with the responsibility to develop alliances and pursue further markets.

=== Environment ===
Kanak is a Senior Fellow of Harvard Law School's Program on International Financial Systems, based in Hong Kong, where he has researched issues relating to climate change, carbon markets, and sustainable growth in Asia.

He is a member of the National Council of the World Wildlife Fund USA, a Trustee of WWF Hong Kong and an advisor to WWF China. Early in his career, Kanak worked at the U.S. Environmental Protection Agency, and served as the Washington representative for a river conservation organization.

=== Other memberships ===
During the past decade, Kanak served as a director of the U.S.-China Business Council and the U.S.-Japan Business Council, as a member of the executive committee of the U.S.-Korea Business Council, and a member of the Seoul International Business Advisory Council (SIBAC). He was President of the American Chamber of Commerce in Japan in 2002 and as its chairman in 2003. He is a member of the Council on Foreign Relations, The Asia Society, the America-Japan Society, the Society of Financial Services Professionals, and the Global Leadership Circle of the University of North Carolina at Chapel Hill.

== Education ==
Kanak completed a BA as a Morehead Scholar at the UNC Chapel Hill, a JD at Harvard Law School and a MLitt (International Business) at Oriel College, Oxford, well known there for his jitterbug.
