= Norman Hitchcock =

American pool player

Norman Hitchcock (c. 1929 – August 28, 2006, in Oklahoma City, Oklahoma) was an American national pool and billiards champion. In 1973, Hitchcock won the national nine-ball championship, placing second for one pocket and second-best all-around at the 1973 Stardust Open Championship in Las Vegas.
