= Michael Bartosh =

Businessman (1977–2006)

- Born: September 18, 1977
- Died: June 11, 2006 (aged 28)
- Known for: Expertise in Mac OS X Server
- Title: President & CTO of 4am Media, Inc.

Michael Bartosh (September 18, 1977 – June 11, 2006) was president and CTO of 4am Media, Inc, an Apple Certified Trainer, certified member of the Apple Consultants Network, published author and former systems engineer for Apple Computer. Previous to joining Apple full-time he had worked as an Apple campus rep (at Texas A&M) and had the opportunity to meet Steve Jobs after his 1999 MacWorld keynote. His main focus and expertise was directory services and integration, and was considered by members of the Macintosh support and development community to be one of the foremost experts on the subject, having literally "written the book."

His most recent work includes Mac OS X Tiger Server Administration (published posthumously), Essential Mac OS X Panther Server Administration, articles published on O'Reilly network (Open Directory and Active Directory parts 1-4 and Panther and Active Directory), as well as presentations and classes at many training centers/events, trade shows and conferences. He was also a regular contributor on several technical mailing lists related to Mac OS X and Mac OS X Server.

== Death ==
He died as a result of injuries caused by a fall from a balcony at a friend's home in Tokyo in June 2006. Police ruled the death an accident. The Michael Bartosh Memorial Scholarship was created in his honor.

== Bibliography ==
- Mac OS X Tiger Server Administration, O'Reilly Media, September 2006, ISBN 0-596-52954-6
- Essential Mac OS X Panther Server Administration, O'Reilly Media, May 2005, ISBN 0-596-00635-7
