= The Culinistas =

The Culinistas is a weekly home-chef and boutique catering service available in New York City, Washington, D.C., and Los Angeles. The company was founded in 2006 by Jill Donenfeld and was previously called "The Dish's Dish".

== The company ==
The Culinistas has expanded to include chefs in New York City, Los Angeles, and Washington DC. Each week, the chefs create a custom menu specific to the client's dietary needs and desires. The chefs buy the ingredients, cook at the client's apartment, pack the food, and stores it in the client's fridge. They prepare a variety of meals to mix and match that last the client one week. Along with offering weekly home cooking services, The Culinistas also cater for parties. The company has been featured in The New York Times, the Los Angeles Times, Food and Wine Magazine, New York Magazine, Entrepreneur, Fast Company, Vanity Fair, and Lucky.

== Founder Jill Donenfeld ==
During her senior year at Barnard College of Columbia University Jill was cooking weekly for four families and decided to turn her passion for cooking into a business. Shortly after her graduation from, she hired two female chefs in New York City and created The Culinistas. Jill was featured as one of the up-and-coming Food and Wine stars in Forbes magazine’s 30 Under 30 2012 list and Danny Meyer referred to her as the next Martha Stewart. She has traveled extensively and her first cookbook, Mankafy Sakafo: Delicious Meals from Madagascar, was published in 2007. In 2011, her second cookbook, Party Like a Culinista: Fresh Recipes, Bold Flavors, and Good Friends, was published. Party Like a Culinista was co-authored by Chef Josetth Gordon, one of the original Culinistas. Jill is currently writing a cookbook for the Bangala Hotel featuring foods from the Chettinada region in India to be published in 2012. She also maintains a weekly column for HelloGiggles called Hummingbird Beats and writes a column for the Huffington Post Blog, Band Bites, where she interviews music groups about their food preferences.
