= Gideon Rodan =

American biochemist

Gideon Alfred Rodan (June 14, 1934 – January 1, 2006) was a Romanian-born American biochemist and Doctor of Medicine.

== Formative years ==
Rodan was born in Bucharest, Romania on June 14, 1934. He completed his doctor of medicine degree at Hebrew University in Jerusalem and was awarded a doctor of philosophy degree by the Weizmann Institute of Science in Rehovot, Israel.

== Career ==
From 1970 to 1985, Rodan taught at the University of Connecticut School of Dental Medicine. He was then hired by Merck Research Laboratories. In 1987, he became president of the American Society for Bone and Mineral Research.

His most notable work involved the study of Osteoporosis. Rodan researched the deformation of bone cells. Investigating the connection between osteoblasts and osteoclasts, he helped to analyze and describe the two.

As director of the department for bone biology and osteoporosis at Merck during the 1990s, he helped to create a compound to block osteoclast-mediated bone resorption. This compound became known as Alendronate or Fosamax. He also examined the role of steroid in bone metabolism and the communication between bones and hormones. In 1996, he edited the book, Principles of Bone Biology.

== Death ==
Rodan died from cancer on January 1, 2006, in Bryn Mawr, Pennsylvania.

== Legacy ==
The American Society for Bone and Mineral Research presented Rodan with its Excellence in Mentorship Award, and then renamed the award in his honor. The Gideon A. Rodan Excellence in Mentorship Award has recognized leading scientist-educators every year since 2001.
