= Honestie Hodges =

African-American teenager (2006–2020)

- Born: November 9, 2006
- Died: November 22, 2020 (aged 14); Grand Rapids, Michigan, U.S.

Honestie Hodges (November 9, 2006 – November 22, 2020) was an African-American teenager from Grand Rapids, Michigan, whose 2017 handcuffing at gunpoint by the Grand Rapids Police Department led to that Department introducing the "Honestie Policy", a Youth Interactions Policy to protect other children from police brutality.

== Handcuffing incident ==
On December 6, 2017, at the age of 11, Honestie Hodges was handcuffed at gunpoint by the Grand Rapids Police Department while the police were searching for a suspect in a reported crime. The body cam footage of her arrest gained nationwide coverage and led to the Grand Rapids Police Department enacting a Youth Interactions Policy, nicknamed the "Honestie Policy", in March 2018. The policy called for using minimally restrictive disciplinary and law-enforcement methods when interacting with children and youth.

In July 2022, the Michigan Department of Civil Rights announced racial discrimination charges were filed against the Grand Rapids Police Department for the handcuffing of Hodges in her 2017 arrest. In May 2023, the Civil Rights Department dropped the charges so the family of Hodges could pursue federal lawsuits against the city. On November 22, 2023, the family filed a lawsuit with the U.S. District Court of Michigan against the city of Grand Rapids, police chief David Rahinsky, and three police officers, with their lawyer stating that “suffered serious mental anguish, anxiety, emotional distress, a sense of outrage, loss of social pleasure and enjoyment, and death”. In 2026 a settlement of US$285,000 was agreed between the parties.

== Personal life and death ==
Hodges was born to Whitney Hodges. Hodges contracted COVID-19 on November 9, 2020, her 14th birthday, during the COVID-19 pandemic in Michigan. She died from the virus 13 days later, on November 22.
