= Corey Jackson (rapper) =

American rapper (born 2006)

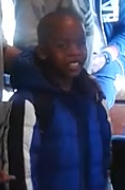
- Jackson in 2016

Background information
- Also known as: Corey J.; Lil C-Note
- Born: July 16, 2006 (age 20); Jackson, Mississippi, U.S.
- Occupations: Rapper; motivational speaker; entrepreneur
- Years active: 2012–2016
- Labels: Fast Life Entertainment; YSL

Corey Jackson (born July 16, 2006), better known by his stage name Corey J. or Lil C-Note, is an American rapper and motivational speaker. He is the protégé of Young Thug and Birdman and is currently signed to Fast Life Entertainment. He is best known for his songs "Crank It", "Call'em Crayons" and "Me and My Daddy" as well as for his "If I Can Do It, You Can To" foundation.

== Life and career ==
Born in Jackson, Mississippi, Jackson began showing signs of his talent by the age of 2 while breakdancing to his father's records. At age 4, while going over colors with his father, he told him that he had written a song, namely "Call'em Crayons". After two years of practice and rehearsals, Jackson released his first single at the age of 6. The single was well received and was followed up with successful singles "Crank It", "Me and My Daddy" and "Bank Close" as well as a nationwide tour including performances at Essence Music Festival in New Orleans and Go Figure Music Festival in Dallas, Texas, earning him awards such as the 'Black Celebrity giving award' and the 'Best Kid artist of the Year' award.

At age 10, Jackson started the "If I Can Do It, You Can To" foundation, with which he toured to give motivational speeches to children in auditoriums, while also making appearances on CNN and The Ellen DeGeneres Show. Since 2013, he helped feed families for Thanksgiving and given out large donations of toys to disenfranchised children. Jackson mentions his father Chase as his biggest influence as well as the positive people around him.

== Legal issues ==
On October 6, 2018, Jackson was arrested at a mall for unlawfully selling his mixtape CDs after he receiving multiple previous warnings from an officer. He was charged with misdemeanor criminal trespass, disorderly conduct, and felony obstruction on a police officer, while his aunt was also charged while trying to intervene. Police alleged that Jackson became verbally combative and tried to break the officer's finger during the arrest.

Jackson denied the accusation claims and stated that he was not actively selling his CDs, but was simply at the mall to meet other artists.

== Discography ==
=== Singles ===
- Skate (Fast Life Entertainment) (2013)
- Call 'em Crayons (Fast Life Entertainment) (2013)
- Me and My Daddy (featuring Chase) (Fast Life Entertainment) (2013)
- Bank Close (Fast Life Entertainment) (2013)
- Real 20's (Fast Life Entertainment) (2016)

=== Mixtapes ===
- Crank It Up In Here Volume 1 - (Fast Life Entertainment) (2014)
- Make My Music Work For Me - Corey J. aka Lil C-Note and Noo Noo (Fast Life Entertainment) (2016)
