= OneSimCard =

International cell phone service provider

- Industry: Wireless Services
- Founded: 2006
- Headquarters: Belmont, Massachusetts, USA
- Area served: Over 200 countries worldwide
- Key people: Alex Filippov, President
- Parent: Belmont Telecom, Inc.
- Website: http://www.onesimcard.com

OneSimCard is a pay-as-you-go international cell phone service provider, offering a single GSM international SIM card granting service in nearly every country in the world.

== History ==
OneSimCard was introduced in 2007, by parent company Belmont Telecom Inc. a licensed U.S. interexchange carrier providing telecommunications services since 2004. OneSimCard is distributed by retail stores throughout North America, including Fry's Electronics. OneSimCard is sold inflight on Virgin Atlantic and Malaysia Airlines. Service can also be purchased online at OneSimCard.com where you can buy international SIM cards as well as purchase and rent international cell phones.

== Services and products ==
OneSimCard's proprietary global travel SIM card allows customers to call from anywhere in the world without incurring additional roaming charges. OneSimCard offers free incoming calls in over 160 countries, outgoing calls from 25 cents per minute and data service from 10 cents/MB.

The SIM card is compatible with unlocked GSM phones and the main phone number, once the SIM card is inserted, is based in the EU. Customers can add phone numbers in the U.S. and many other countries for an additional cost. OneSimCard has an unusually rich range of calling options, including a special Mobile app for both Android and iPhones, OneSim VOIP, which makes calls at very low rates when connected to a Wi-Fi network. There are no contracts or monthly fees to use OneSimCard service and additional features are available for businesses to manage any number of traveling employees via a flexible web-based account management system. OneSimCard offers American-based customer service.

OneSimCard also offers services to Machine (M2M) / Internet of Things (IoT) devices users, supporting both businesses (B2B) and individual customers (B2C). OneSimCard M2M / IoT services are available in over 160 countries, allowing users extensive international roaming and tracking capabilities. M2M / IoT services offered to B2B and individual customers have 1kb billing increments and provide low cost use on M2M devices in multiple countries.
