= William Winn =

William David "Bill" Winn (1945–2006) was an American educational psychologist, and professor at the University of Washington College of Education, known for his work on how people learn from diagrams, and on how cognitive and constructivist theories of learning can help instructional designers select effective teaching strategies.

== Biography ==
Specializing first in French and German languages and comparative literature, Winn earned a BA and MA from Oxford University and an MA from Indiana University. He earned a PhD from Indiana University (1972) in Instructional Systems Technology (minor educational psychology) for research on instructional message design. His doctoral dissertation was on the Similarity of Hierarchically Organized Pairs of Pictures and Words as Reported by Field-Dependent and Field-Independent High-School Seniors.

In 1972 Winn started his academic career as assistant professor in the Department of Pedagogy, Faculty of Education, at the Université de Sherbrooke. From 1974 to 1985, he was the academic coordinator of the Learning Technology Unit at the University of Calgary. Eventually, Winn was appointed professor at the University of Washington College of Education where he held appointments in curriculum and instruction, and cognitive studies. He was also director of the Learning Center at the Human Interface Technology Lab (HITLab), and adjunct professor in the College of Engineering, and the Music department.

Winn was the editor of Educational Communication and Technology Journal, and served on the editorial review boards of many other journals in the fields of educational psychology and educational technology.

== Work ==
Winn's areas of teaching and research included instructional theory, design of computer-based learning, instructional effects of illustrations, theories of visual perception applied to instructional materials design, computer interfaces, and the roles and effectiveness of virtual environments in education and training. This work extended cognitive theories of learning into systems dynamics models of cognition and cognitive neuroscience.

Winn collaborated broadly across disciplines and national boundaries, presenting papers in French, German and English. In addition to teaching, extensive graduate advising activities, and a prolific writing schedule, at the time of his death he was working on research with the Puget Sound Marine Environment Modeling Group, augmented reality and physical models of complex organic molecules, INFACT/PixelMath, and collaborating with PRISM and the Center for Environmental Visualization.

=== Computer-based learning ===
Winn was very interested in computer-based learning for being a method that allows students to obtain information in formats that cannot be presented by teachers and because it gives the students control of the information. He acknowledged that computer-based learning follows a constructivist learning approach because students construct understandings for themselves by interacting with the material they encounter.

=== Virtual environments ===
Winn also focused his research in constructing virtual learning environments which are computer created environments intended to simulate realistic experiences in order to help students understand concepts presented in those environments. For example, Winn explained “that the act of designing and creating environments that embody concepts and principles governing phenomena as diverse as wetlands ecology and medieval castles helps students master these topics with depth and clarity”. He also found that virtual learning has greater success for students who do poorly in school. However, teaching through virtual environments also has its weaknesses. Winn declared that this method of learning often result in misconceptions due to oversimplifying the interactions that occur in the natural environments which are simulated. Additionally, problems in the transfer of knowledge are seen in younger students who lack the ability to think abstractly. These children have a difficulty transferring what they learn in the virtual world to other areas in the real world.

=== Learning oceanography from a computer compared to direct experience at sea ===
This is an example of one of the studies conducted by Winn in which he evaluated the difference of learning in a computer-based environment as opposed to learning through direct experience. In this study, two groups of college students learned oceanography. One group learned using a computer simulation of the ocean which included a three-dimensional (3D) model, and the other group learned by spending a day in a research vessel and used oceanographic tools. In his discussion of this study Winn makes reference to Kolb's experiential learning theory because it highlights the significance of direct experience with the environment, as well as the need for abstract concepts in order to learn and apply knowledge. According to Winn, the proper use of metaphors in simulations may allow students to learn abstract concepts better than they would in real experiences. This study took place in Seattle and was focused on the oceanography of the Puget Sound estuary system within Washington. There were 25 students in each group and both groups received a total of three lessons. Two of the lessons were taught by the same professors and covered the same material. For the third lesson the groups were separated to their different settings. One of the limitations of this study was that the students taking the “Virtual Puget Sound” (VPS) experience could only control some independent variables but not others, like for example they could not change the salinity of the water. The results of the study showed “no difference in overall learning between students who used the VPS simulation and those who studied the same material in the field”. However, the study found that students with less experience in water learned more from direct experience, while the simulated ocean experience helped students transfer the knowledge they obtained while working in the computer, to the material presented in class.

=== Response to criticism ===
After reading Winn's article titled "Current trends in educational technology research: The study of learning environments" published in 2002, the educational psychologist Richard Mayer (2003) criticized Winn's article for dismissing controlled experiments and in this way dismissing an approach that would produce substantial evidence and enable researchers to make claims on the learning development of students. In response to Mayer's criticism, Winn confirmed that experimental research is important, and he proposed that researchers use a system that connects evidence from both experimental and non-experimental research when conducting their studies since each method produces different information. Controlled experimental research is useful for obtaining details about student learning, and non-experimental research allows the researcher to see how learning occurs in real settings.

=== Non-experimental research method ===
As part of his response to Mayer's criticism, Winn articulates that a good non-experimental method for researchers to use is the “design experiment” which was described by Ann Brown in 1992. Winn prefers this type of experiment particularly because it conveys many features of open ended research methods. In a design experiment, the researcher tests his or her intervention in an educational setting such as a classroom, makes modifications depending on the data collected, and conducts the intervention until it produces good results. The data collected is in form of observations, results from tests, or any form of work that will show that the student has learned what is expected. Compared to a controlled experiment in which many variables are controlled, in the design experiment, modifications are made over time. Winn explained that a key difference between the two types of experiments is that “the controlled experiment adapts the setting to suit the intervention through experimental control, whereas the design experiment adapts the intervention to suit the setting through iteration”. Although Winn is in favor of design experiments he does note one of its weaknesses. This type of non-experimental research involves more time and skill than implementing experimental research. However, it can yield crucial evidence about the success of interventions and how students learn.

=== Implications for educational technology ===
Winn made significant contributions to the field of educational technology as evident by his extensive research in this area. The following is a list of eight suggestions provided by Winn (2002) for those researchers who are also working in this field, or for future researchers. This list provides useful information on how practitioners can reduce factors that may disrupt research findings and thus assist in improving educational technology research.

1. Instructors should not use metaphors that may confuse students or prevent them from understanding concepts.
2. Computer learning environments yield greater results when conducted under a constructivist approach. Instructors should allow for mistakes and should not use virtual environments to teach basic facts.
3. Educational technology is not a sufficient method for teaching. Educators should implement activities and other methods of communication into their lessons.
4. Students must understand the task they have to accomplish and they require scaffolding to obtain their end goal.
5. Educators must implement social context in the technology driven learning environment, and acknowledge sharing and collaboration amongst students.
6. Educators should involve experts from the outside community in order to make their teaching effective.
7. Educators should promote that the students make changes to their learning environment, as this will allow educators to obtain information about student learning.
8. Educators, students, and researchers should work as a team since they all contribute to the improvement of educational technology research.

== Selected publications ==
- Winn, William D. "Content Structure and Cognition in Instructional Systems" (1978).

Articles, a selection:

- Winn, W.D. (1987). Charts, graphics and diagrams in educational materials. In D. Willows and H. Houghton (Eds.), The Psychology of Illustration. Vol. 1. Basic Research. New York: Springer, 152–198.
- Winn, W.D. (1990). A theoretical framework for research on learning from graphics. International Journal of Educational Research, 14, 553–564.
- Winn, W.D. (1991). Learning from maps and diagrams. Educational Psychology Review, 3, 211–247.
- Winn, W.D. (1993). An account for how people search for information in diagrams. Contemporary Educational Psychology, 18, 162–185.
- Winn, W.D. (1994). Contributions of perceptual and cognitive processes to the comprehension of graphics. W. Schnotz & R. Kulhavy (Eds.), Comprehension of Graphics. Amsterdam: Elsevier. 3-27.
