= Helmut W. Schulz =

- Born: 1912; Berlin, Germany
- Died: January 28, 2006 (aged 93–94); White Plains, United States
- Education: Columbia University B.S.M.S.Ph.D.
- Known for: uranium enrichment
- Scientific career
- Fields: Physics, chemistry
- Workplaces: Columbia University Union Carbide United States Department of Defense
- Doctoral advisor: Charles Hard Townes

Helmut W. Schulz (1912 – 28 January 2006) was a German chemical engineer and professor at Columbia University known for his many works in disparate fields like nuclear physics, rocketry and waste-to-energy processes. He developed the process for separating uranium isotopes.

== Early life ==
Wilhelm Schulz was born in 1912 in Berlin and moved to New York with his family in 1924. He was valedictorian at Brooklyn Technical High School. Later, he received a Pulitzer scholarship to Columbia University and earned a B.S. in 1933 and an M.S. in 1934.

Upon graduation, he went to work for Union Carbide and traveled in 1940 to Niagara Falls to help improve its methanol plant. While experimenting, he used a contaminated bottle of solution which exploded on contact. The caustic splattering blinded him.

== Work and research ==
When Schulz learned that physicists at Columbia University had achieved fission of a uranium isotope, he worked and succeeded in devising a process for separating uranium isotopes using a gas centrifuge, presenting his idea in a paper to university researchers. When the government settled on the gaseous diffusion process to enrich uranium, Schulz filed for a patent in 1942 which was granted in 1951. Returning to Union Carbide after receiving his Ph.D. in chemical engineering from Columbia in 1942, Schulz wrote two papers on the possibility of using infrared radiation to generate molecular reactions.

In 1948, Schulz approached Charles H. Townes at Columbia University and offered him a Union Carbide fellowship. Impressed by Schulz's inventiveness, Townes used his fellowship to hire Arthur L. Schawlow. Together, they later invented the laser and its cousin, the maser. Both received the Nobel Prize in Physics.

In the 1960s, Schulz developed new ways to produce solid rocket fuel and then took a leave from Union Carbide to oversee the United States Department of Defense's rocket propulsion program.

Finally retiring from Union Carbide in 1969, and with a grant from the National Science Foundation, Schulz returned to Columbia to study ways to convert waste to energy. He developed clean processes to produce electricity using solid waste, sewage sludge, and even toxic materials like PCBs, and chemical weapons.

In 1977, when the United States planned to build the first gas centrifuge plant, the United States Department of Energy awarded Schulz $100,000 as a royalty for his contribution.

== Personal life ==
Helmut Schulz was married to Colette Prieur Schulz. They had five children and seven grandchildren.
