= Jane Hope Hastings =

American actress

- Born: April 16, 1902; Budapest, Hungary
- Died: September 10, 2006 (aged 104); Hamden, Connecticut, U.S.
- Other name: Katherine Kelenen
- Occupation: Actress
- Years active: 1941–1955

Jane Hope Hastings (April 16, 1902 – September 10, 2006) also known as Katherine Kelenen, was a stage actress. She served as a director of the United Service Organizations (USO) from 1941 to 1955.

== Early life ==
Katherine Kelenen was born in Budapest, Hungary on April 16, 1902. Her family immigrated to America in the early 20th-century, settling in St. Louis, Missouri. When Kelenen graduated from high school, she left for New York City to pursue an acting career. While auditioning, she changed her name to Jane Hope. She soon became involved with the Columbia Laboratory Players of Columbia University's drama department, appearing in several plays and becoming an understudy for stage director David Belasco's productions.

== Professional background ==
Kelenen began her 14–year career with the USO in 1941. Her first assignment was in Falmouth, Massachusetts, directing the USO for Camp Edwards. To her mind, her most important achievement in Falmouth was opening the Service Wives' Kitchen, which was a place for wives to spend the day, away from their rented furnished rooms. The wives had each other for company, and were able to cook meals for their servicemen husbands when the men had leave from the base. It became the home-away-from-home for these families serving their country. With the USO she traveled all over the world, from Cape Cod to Alaska, Brazil to Puerto Rico, and New York City to California.

== Personal background ==
After Kelenen retired from the USO in 1955, she married Harold J. Barrett that same year; he died in 1964. In 1980, she married George Sands Hastings, whom she had met at a Quaker meeting. A former vice president of the American Machine and Foundry company, he died on March 16, 1990. Kelenen died in Hamden, Connecticut on September 10, 2006.
