= Herbert Schilder =

American dentist (1928–2006)

Doctor Herbert Schilder
- Born: September 8, 1928; Brooklyn, New York
- Died: January 25, 2006 (aged 77)
- Education: D.D.S. from NYU
- Occupation: Dental surgeon
- Title: President of the American Association of Endodontists; President of the Massachusetts Dental Society; First Vice President of the American Dental Association; Chairman of the Department of Endodontics, Boston University (1966-1999)
- Spouse: Joan Baylor
- Children: 1

Herbert Schilder (8 September 1928 in Brooklyn, New York – 25 January 2006 in Newton, Massachusetts) was a dental surgeon. Schilder is best known for the improvements he made to root canal therapies (endodontic therapy) in the 1960s when he taught at the Boston University School of Dental Medicine.

Herbert Schilder received his D.D.S. from New York University, and taught at Tufts University and Temple University prior to permanently joining Boston University in 1958. In his early years after joining Boston University, he founded the specialty program in endodontics to train dentists to become endodontists. He also developed a new technique to fill root canals after disinfection, now known as "Schilder's warm gutta-percha vertical compaction technique." This technique is now widely used by most endodontic programs.

He was president of the American Association of Endodontists and the Massachusetts Dental Society. He was also the first vice president of the American Dental Association.

Dr. Schilder was a very influential scholar and educator in endodontics. His level of popularity in the field led to the use of his name in the movie Finding Nemo, in which the "Schilder technique" was mentioned in the conversation between the fish.

== Sources ==
https://www.nature.com/articles/sj.bdj.2018.22 News Published: 12 January 2018 Dentists on film: Finding Nemo British Dental Journal volume 224, page7 (2018)
