= United Nations Security Council Resolution 1944 =

UN Security Council Resolution 1944
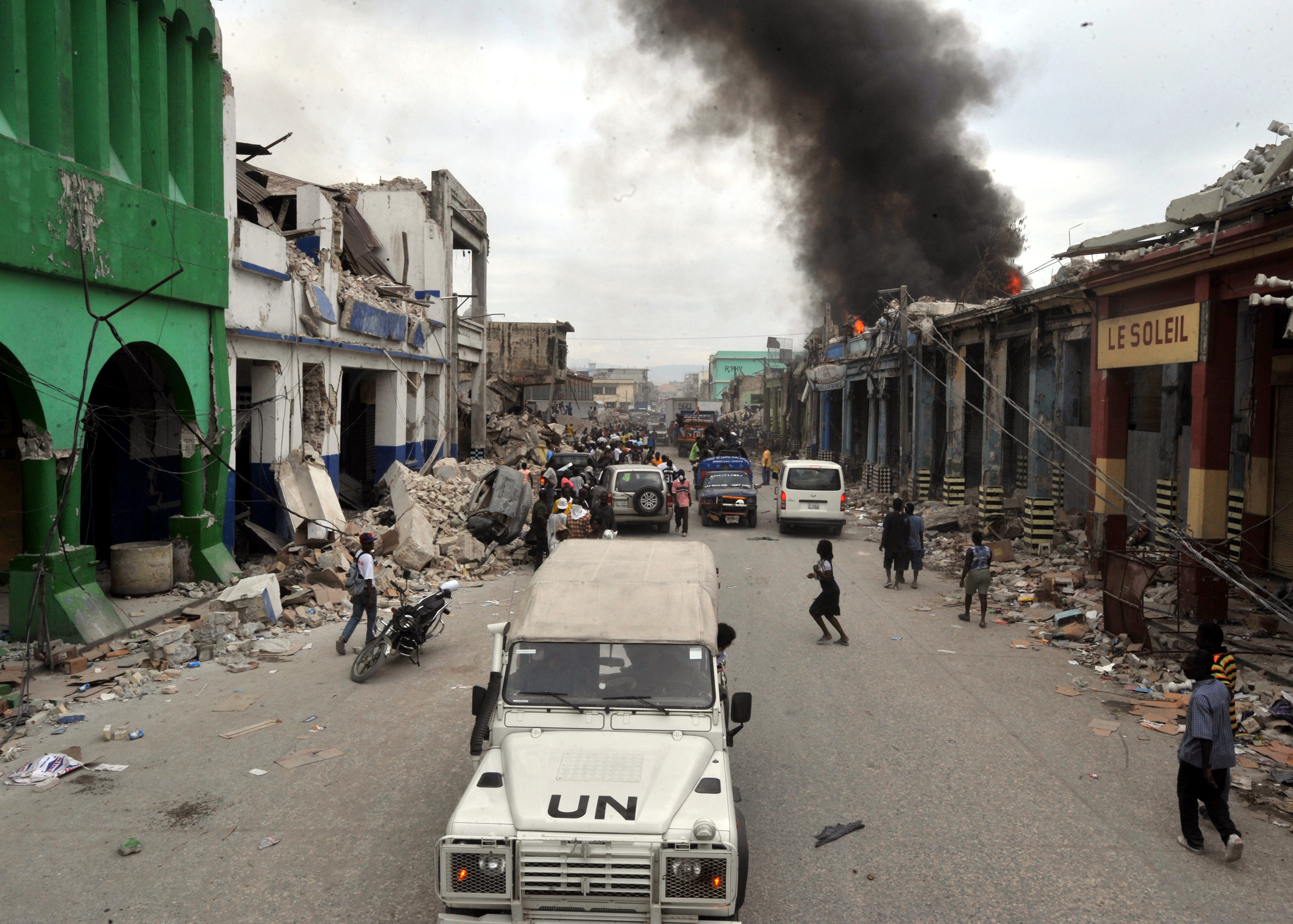
- MINUSTAH vehicle in Port-au-Prince
- Date: 14 October 2010
- Meeting no.: 6,399
- Code: S/RES/1944 (Document)
- Subject: The situation in Haiti
- Voting summary: 15 voted for; None voted against; None abstained
- Result: Adopted

Security Council composition
- Permanent members: China; France; Russia; United Kingdom; United States
- Non-permanent members: Austria; Bosnia–Herzegovina; Brazil; Gabon; Japan; Lebanon; Mexico; Nigeria; Turkey; Uganda

United Nations Security Council Resolution 1944, adopted unanimously on October 14, 2010, after recalling previous resolutions on Haiti, including resolutions 1542 (2004), 1576 (2004), 1608 (2005), 1658 (2006), 1702 (2006), 1743 (2006), 1780 (2007), 1840 (2008), 1892 (2009), 1908 (2010) and 1927 (2010), the Council renewed the mandate of the United Nations Stabilization Mission in Haiti (MINUSTAH) until October 15, 2011.

== Resolution ==
=== Observations ===
In the preamble of the resolution, the Council recognised that the earthquake in January 2010 brought new challenges and opportunities to Haiti. The Haitian government and authorities were called upon to ensure the holding of general elections on November 28, 2010. The Council stated that the reconstruction of Haiti was crucial to long-term security and stability, and that it should go hand in hand with economic and social development. Donors were urged to fulfil their pledges towards Haiti at a conference on March 31, 2010. The Organization of American States (OAS) was praised for its efforts towards electoral preparations.

There were concerns about the increasing number of weapons in circulation, drug trafficking and security in refugee camps. The Council recognised that respect for human rights, combating crime and sexual violence, and ending impunity were essential in maintaining order. In addition, the presence of MINUSTAH peacekeepers and the United Nations was critical to security and stability in Haiti. It welcomed the efforts of former United States President Bill Clinton as the United Nations Special Envoy for Haiti.

=== Acts ===
Acting under Chapter VII of the United Nations Charter, the mandate of MINUSTAH was extended until October 15, 2011 with 8,940 troops and 4,391 police, with the intention of further renewal. The resolution determined that Haiti and its people were ultimately responsible for the stabilisation of the country, and free and fair elections were an important prerequisite.

MINUSTAH was required to continue various activities in Haiti, including training of the Haitian National Police, tackling crime, protecting human rights, judicial reform and activities to enhance trust of the Haitian population towards MINUSTAH. The Council condemned violence against children and abuse of women and girls and requested the Secretary-General Ban Ki-moon to pay attention to the issue in his future reports on the situation in Haiti.

== See also ==
- 2010 Haiti earthquake
- List of United Nations Security Council Resolutions 1901 to 2000 (2009–2011)
