= United Nations Security Council Resolution 1927 =

UN Security Council Resolution 1927
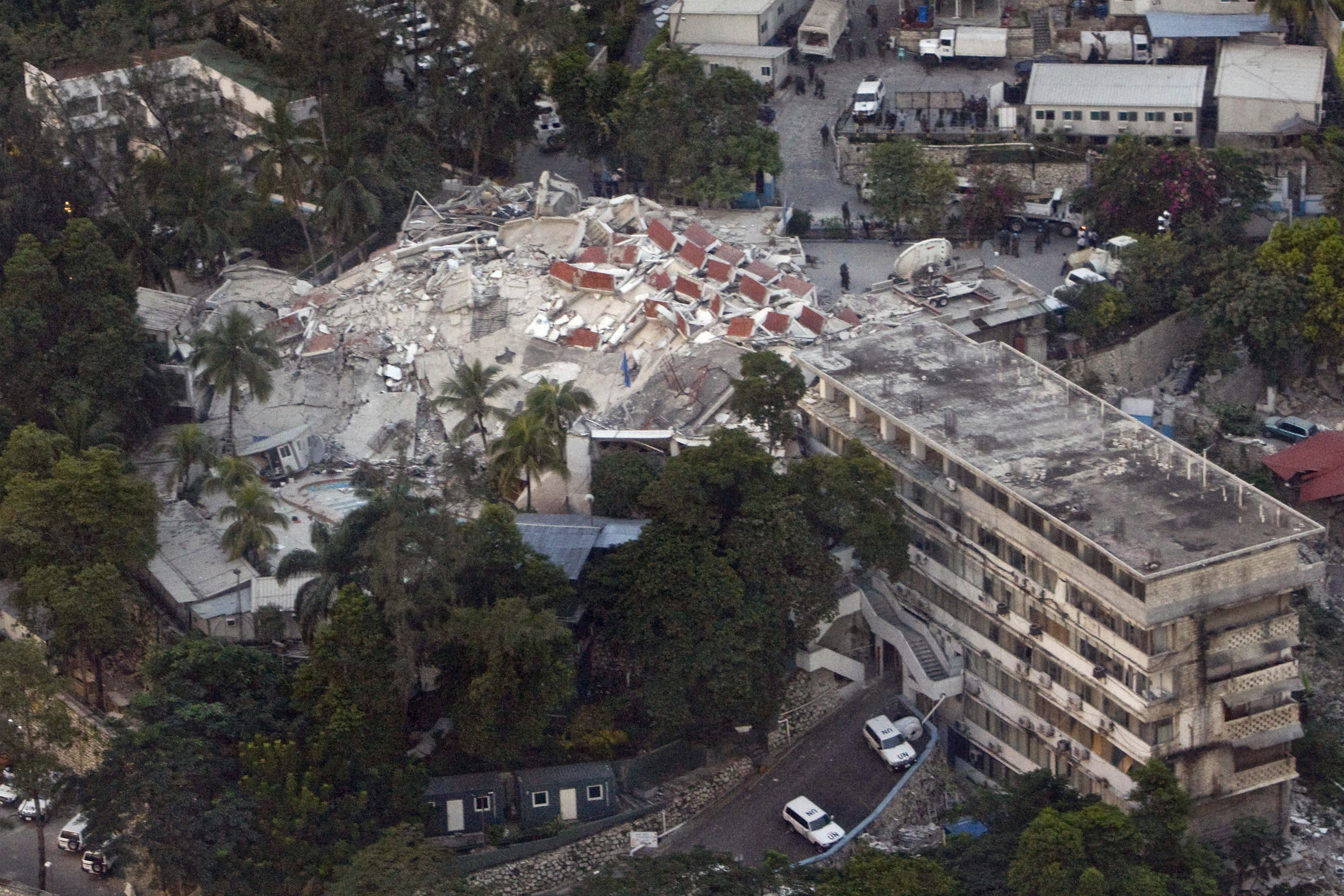
- Destroyed United Nations headquarters in Haiti
- Date: 4 June 2010
- Meeting no.: 6,330
- Code: S/RES/1927 (Document)
- Subject: The situation in Haiti
- Voting summary: 15 voted for; None voted against; None abstained
- Result: Adopted

Security Council composition
- Permanent members: China; France; Russia; United Kingdom; United States
- Non-permanent members: Austria; Bosnia–Herzegovina; Brazil; Gabon; Japan; Lebanon; Mexico; Nigeria; Turkey; Uganda

United Nations Security Council Resolution 1927, adopted unanimously on June 4, 2010, after recalling previous resolutions on Haiti, including resolutions 1542 (2004), 1576 (2004), 1608 (2005), 1658 (2006), 1702 (2006), 1743 (2006), 1780 (2007), 1840 (2008), 1892 (2009) and 1908 (2010), the Council authorised an additional deployment of 680 police as part of the United Nations Stabilization Mission in Haiti (MINUSTAH).

The Security Council was concerned at new challenges and dangers in the aftermath of the earthquake in January. The presence of MINUSTAH peacekeepers would continue to focus on the security and stability of the country. It also noted that there were more international efforts to ensure the functioning of state institutions and basic services. At the same time, the Council welcomed the Haitian government's "Action Plan for National Recovery and Development" and contributions presented at the International Donors' Conference "Towards a New Future for Haiti" on March 31, 2010 that totalled around US$15 billion over a decade. It was stressed that the Haitian government had a leading role in the post-disaster recovery, protection of human rights and holding general elections in a timely manner.

Acting under Chapter VII of the United Nations Charter, the Council authorised a temporary surge of a further 680 police with a focus on building the capacity of the Haitian National Police. A report by the Secretary-General Ban Ki-moon recommended the increase after a number of dangerous criminals escaped from prison during the earthquake. MINUSTAH would consist of 8,940 military personnel and 4,391 police where numbers would be kept under constant review during the electoral period. It was to continue assisting the Haitian people, especially vulnerable groups such as displaced persons, women and children due to risks from gang violence, organised crime and child trafficking, and support the relief operations. Finally, MINUSTAH was also required to support preparations for the general elections.

== See also ==
- Humanitarian response to the 2010 Haiti earthquake
- List of United Nations Security Council Resolutions 1901 to 2000 (2009–2011)
