= United Nations Security Council Resolution 1702 =

UN Security Council Resolution 1702
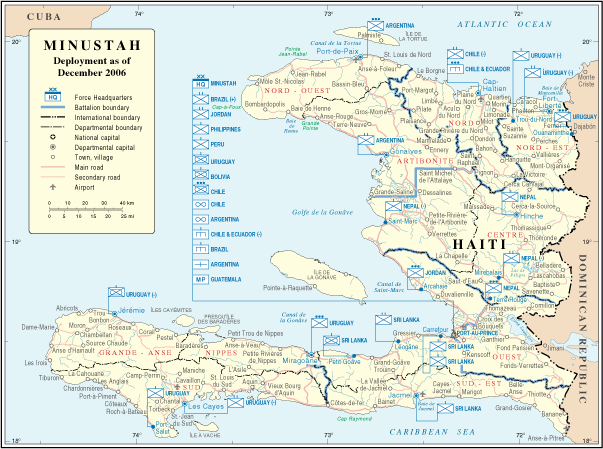
- Deployment of MINUSTAH in Haiti (2006)
- Date: 15 August 2006
- Meeting no.: 5,513
- Code: S/RES/1702 (Document)
- Subject: The question concerning Haiti
- Voting summary: 15 voted for; None voted against; None abstained
- Result: Adopted

Security Council composition
- Permanent members: China; France; Russia; United Kingdom; United States
- Non-permanent members: Argentina; Rep. of the Congo; Denmark; Ghana; Greece; Japan; Peru; Qatar; Slovakia; Tanzania

United Nations Security Council Resolution 1702, adopted unanimously on August 15, 2006, after recalling resolutions 1542 (2004), 1576 (2004), 1608 (2005) and 1658 (2006) on the situation in Haiti, the Council extended the mandate of the United Nations Stabilisation Mission in Haiti (MINUSTAH) until February 15, 2007.

== Resolution ==
=== Observations ===
In the preamble of the resolution, the Council welcomed the transition to an elected government, President and parliament as an opportunity to "break with the violence and political instability of the past". Therefore, it was important that there was reform of the security sector, law enforcement, national reconciliation and economic and social development. At the same time, Council members emphasised the importance of MINUSTAH in the stabilisation of the country.

All violations of human rights in Haiti were condemned in the text; the Haitian government was urged to promote human rights. The Council welcomed a police reform plan put forward by the government. It also acknowledged that conditions for a disarmament, demobilisation and reintegration did not exist in Haiti, so alternative programmes were required. There was also a need to implement effective labour-intensive projects to help create jobs and deliver basic services.

The remainder of the introduction addressed the role of the international community in the Haitian transition process.

=== Acts ===
Acting under Chapter VII of the United Nations Charter, the Security Council extended MINUSTAH's mandate until mid-February 2007 with the intention of further renewals. It was decided that the peacekeeping operation would consist of 7,200 troops and 1,951 officers; 16 correction officers would also be deployed to support the prison system.

The resolution went on to set out MINUSTAH's role in reforming many areas of Haitian society, including the rule of law, justice and the promotion of human rights. It was also important that the mission had a good public outreach strategy to inform the local population of its mandate in the country.

== See also ==
- 2004 Haitian coup d'état
- List of United Nations Security Council Resolutions 1701 to 1800 (2006–2008)
