= Edson Leal Pujol =

Brazilian Army general

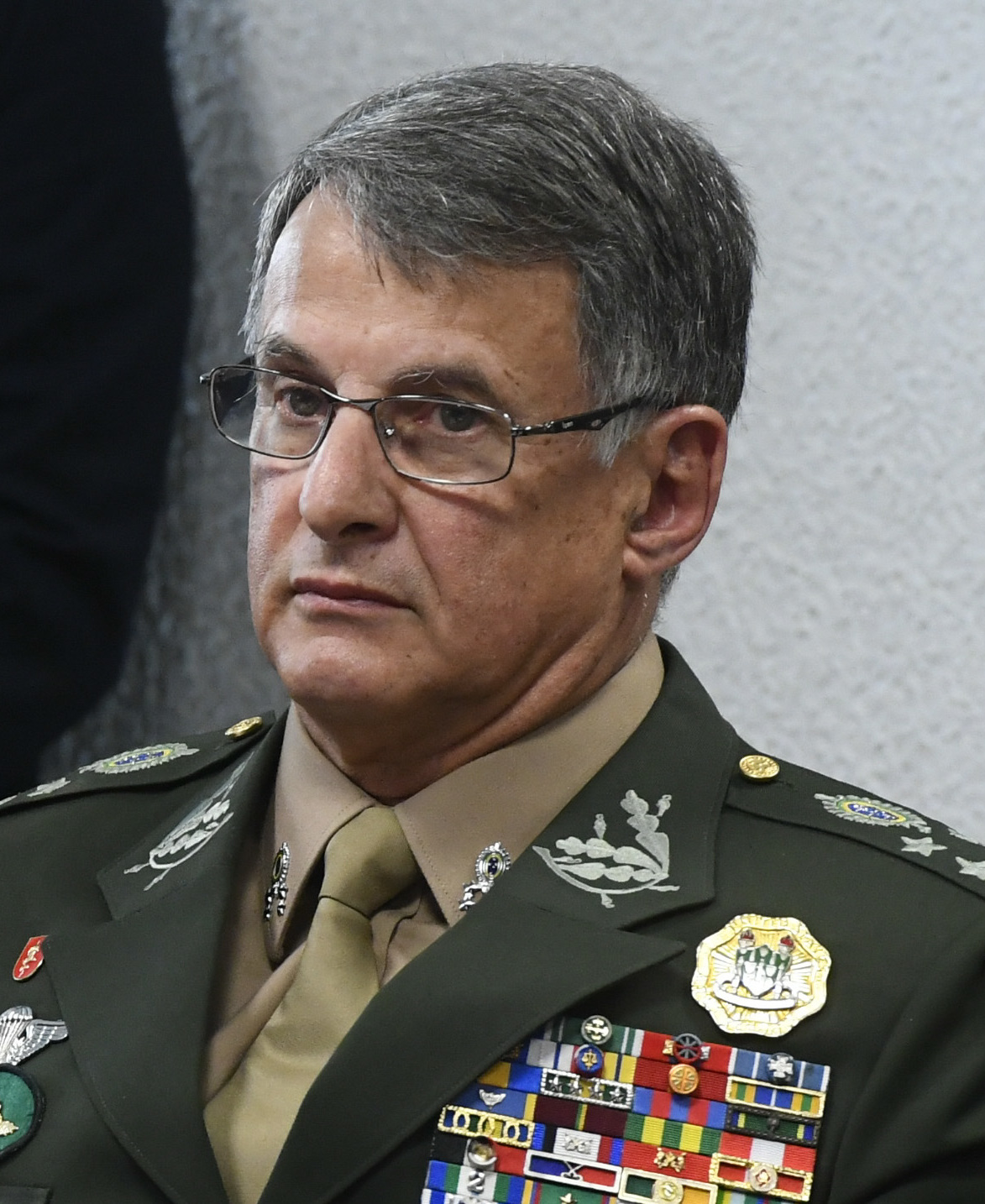

Commander of the Brazilian Army
- In office 11 January 2019 – 30 March 2021
- President: Jair Bolsonaro
- Minister of Defence: Fernando Azevedo e Silva
- Preceded by: Eduardo Villas Bôas
- Succeeded by: Paulo Sérgio Nogueira de Oliveira

Commander of MINUSTAH
- In office March 2013 – March 2014
- Head: Nigel Fisher; Sandra Honoré
- Preceded by: Fernando Rodrigues Goulart
- Succeeded by: José Luiz Jaborandy Junior

Personal details
- Born: Edson Leal Pujol; 2 January 1955 (age 70); Dom Pedrito, RS, Brazil

Military service
- Allegiance: Brazil; United Nations
- Branch/service: Brazilian Army
- Rank: Army General
- Commands: 1st Mechanized Cavalry Brigade; Agulhas Negras Military Academy; MINUSTAH; Southern Military Command
- Awards: Marshal Hermes Medal; Order of Military Merit (Grand Officer II) (Brazil); Medal of the Peacekeeper

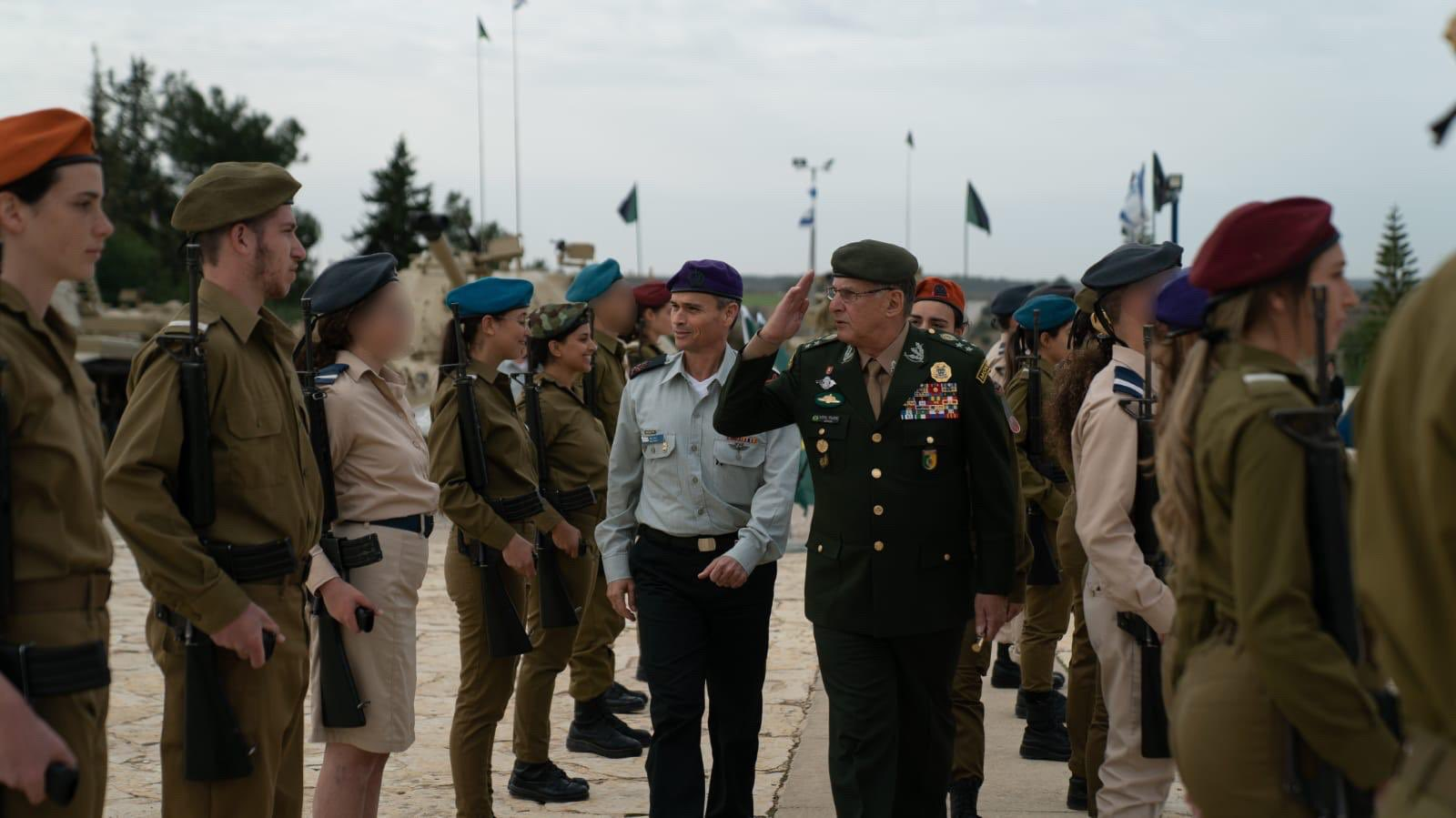
Edson Leal Pujol visit to Israel, December 2019

General (four-star rank) Edson Leal Pujol (Dom Pedrito; born January 2, 1955) is a General in the Brazilian Army. He was the Brazilian Army Commander, from January 2019 to March 2021.

== Military career ==
Pujol graduated in 1977 from the Brazilian Military Academy Academia Militar das Agulhas Negras (AMAN), ranked first in his class in the Cavalry branch. He also achieved first place in his class at the Advanced Course, Escola de Aperfeiçoamento de Oficias (EsAO) and the Command and General Staff School Escola de Comando e Estado-Maior do Exército (Brazil) (ECEME). He has been awarded the silver Hermes medal with three gold crowns.

As a general officer, he commanded the 1st Mechanized Cavalry Brigade, located in Santiago, Rio Grande do Sul and between 25 April 2009 and 29 April 2011 was the Commander of AMAN.

He was appointed by the United Nations Secretary-General as Force Commander of the United Nations Stabilisation Mission in Haiti (MINUSTAH) on 27 March 2013.

In 2018, he was Chief of the Army Science and Technology Department and was appointed by President-elect Jair Bolsonaro to be Brazilian Army Commander.

=== Awards ===
- Marshal Hermes Medal
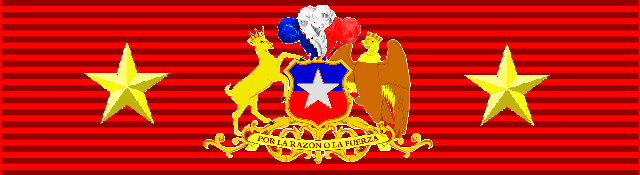
- Order of Military Merit (Grand Officer II) (Brazil)
- Medal of the Peacekeeper

Diplomatic posts
Preceded by Fernando Rodrigues Goulart	Commander of MINUSTAH; 2013–2014	Succeeded by José Luiz Jaborandy Junior
Military offices
Preceded by Eduardo Villas Bôas	Commander of the Brazilian Army; 2019–21	Succeeded by Paulo Sérgio Nogueira de Oliveira
