= United Nations Security Council Resolution 1908 =

UN Security Council Resolution 1908
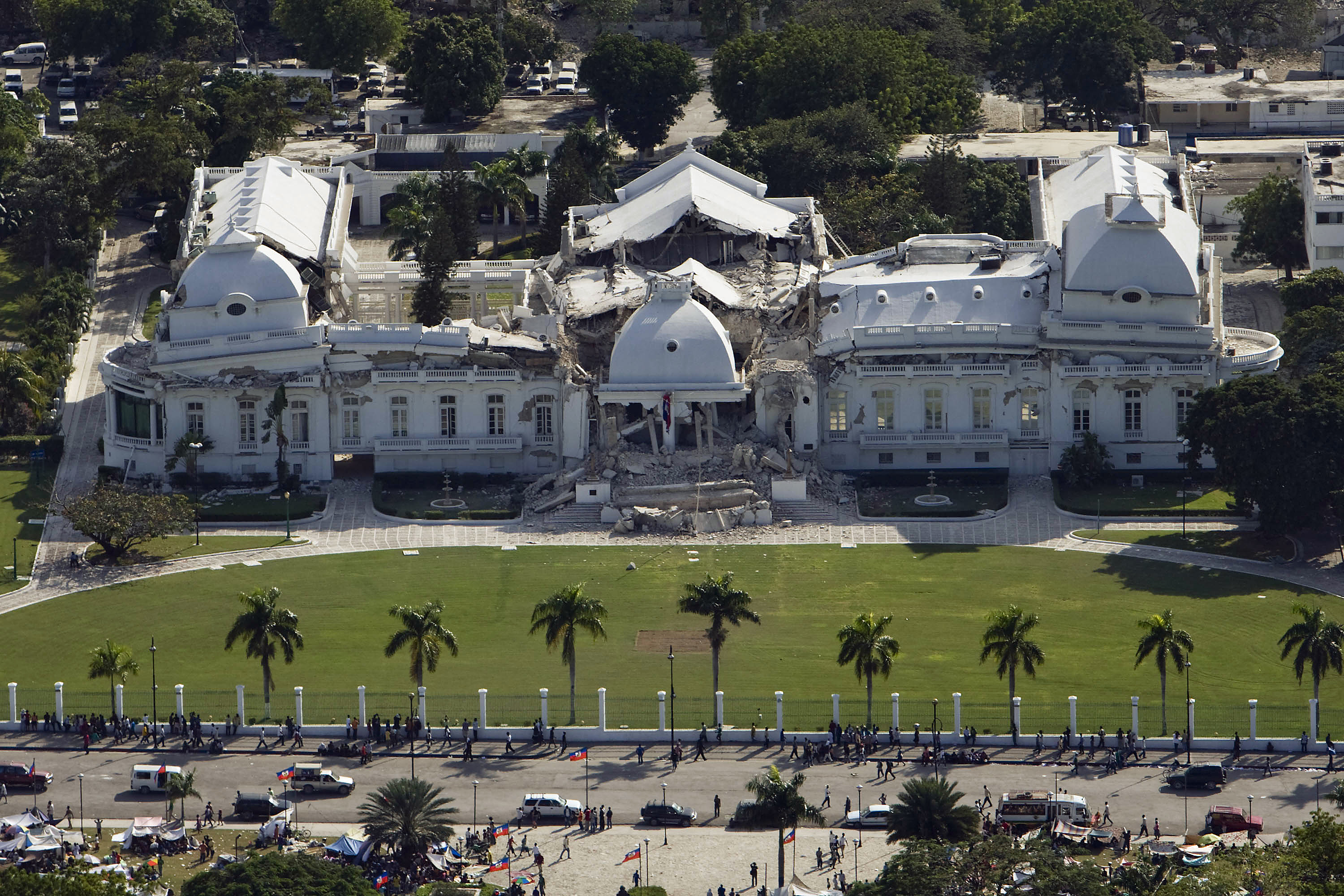
- Damaged Haitian Presidential Palace
- Date: 19 January 2010
- Meeting no.: 6,261
- Code: S/RES/1908 (Document)
- Subject: The situation in Haiti
- Voting summary: 15 voted for; None voted against; None abstained
- Result: Adopted

Security Council composition
- Permanent members: China; France; Russia; United Kingdom; United States
- Non-permanent members: Austria; Bosnia–Herzegovina; Brazil; Gabon; Japan; Lebanon; Mexico; Nigeria; Turkey; Uganda

United Nations Security Council Resolution 1908, adopted unanimously on January 19, 2010, after endorsing the Secretary-General's recommendation, the Council increased the size of the United Nations Stabilization Mission in Haiti (MINUSTAH) established under Resolution 1542 (2004), in the aftermath of the 2010 Haiti earthquake. The resolution authorised an additional 3,500 peacekeepers for Haiti, bringing the total number of MINUSTAH troops to 8,940 and a police component to 3,711.

The resolution also expressed sympathy and solidarity to those affected by the earthquake.

The Force consists of troops from up to 17 countries, including Argentina, Bolivia, Canada, Jordan, France, South Korea and the United States, and police from 41 countries, including Argentina, Bangladesh, Brazil, Egypt, Russia and Spain.

The month's President of the Council, Zhang Yesui of the People's Republic of China, said that the adoption of the resolution would be important for maintaining peace and stability, supporting relief efforts and helping to restore post-disaster reconstruction.

== See also ==
- Humanitarian response to the 2010 Haiti earthquake
- List of United Nations Security Council Resolutions 1901 to 2000 (2009–2011)
