= United Nations Security Council Resolution 1658 =

UN Security Council Resolution 1658
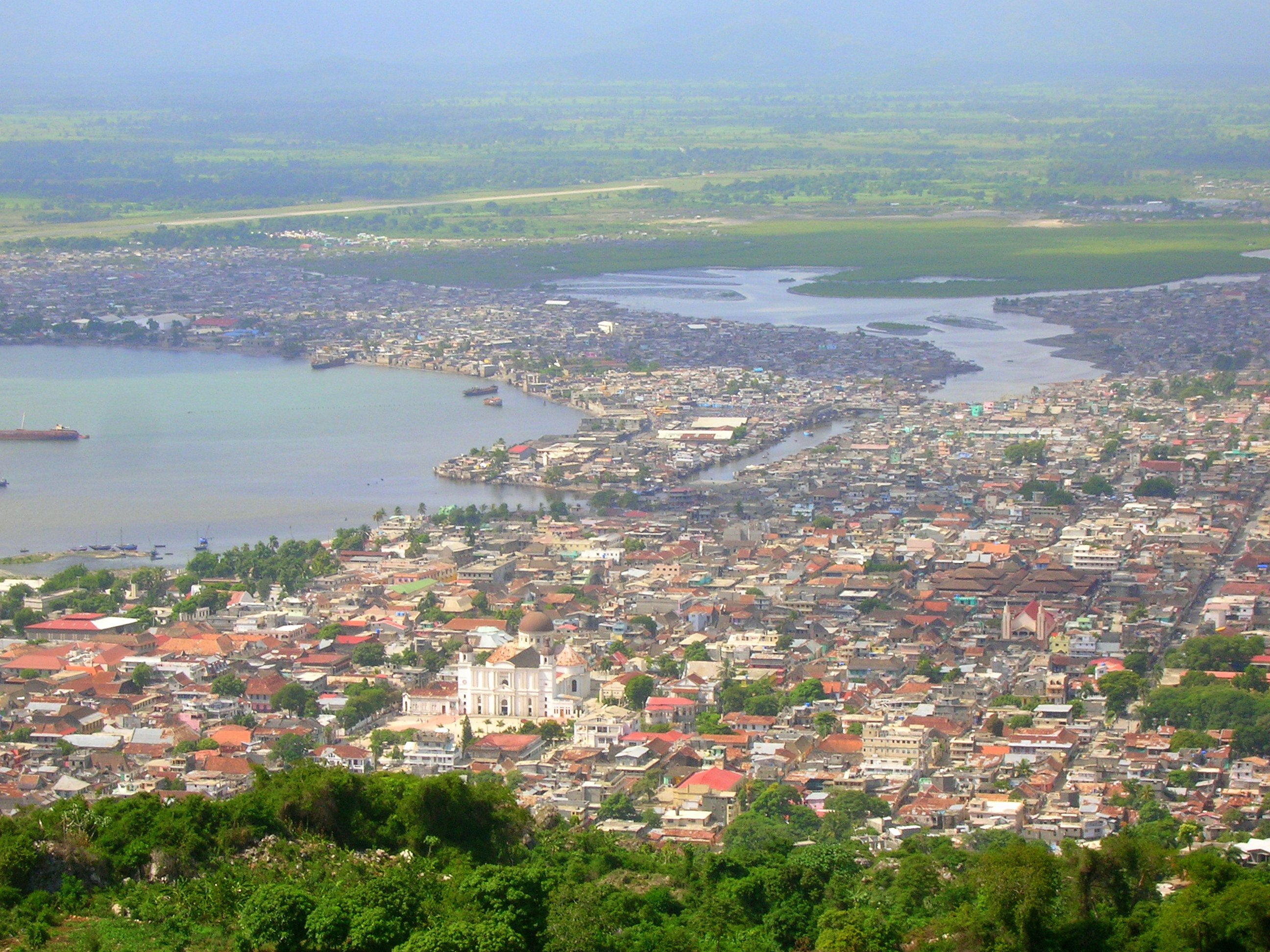
- City of Cap-Haïtien in northern Haiti
- Date: 14 February 2006
- Meeting no.: 5,372
- Code: S/RES/1658 (Document)
- Subject: The question concerning Haiti
- Voting summary: 15 voted for; None voted against; None abstained
- Result: Adopted

Security Council composition
- Permanent members: China; France; Russia; United Kingdom; United States
- Non-permanent members: Argentina; Rep. of the Congo; Denmark; Ghana; Greece; Japan; Peru; Qatar; Slovakia; Tanzania

United Nations Security Council Resolution 1658, adopted unanimously on February 14, 2006, after recalling resolutions 1542 (2004), 1576 (2004) and 1608 (2005) on the situation in Haiti, the Council extended the mandate of the United Nations Stabilisation Mission in Haiti (MINUSTAH) until August 15, 2006.

== Resolution ==
=== Observations ===
In the preamble of the resolution, the Council commended the holding of general elections on February 7, 2006, and welcomed the progress made in the political process and the role of MINUSTAH. It awaited the inauguration of a new President and recognised that a new chapter in the international community's efforts in Haiti would begin with the installation of a new government.

Council members stressed that security, the rule of law, political reconciliation and development were essential to the stability of Haiti; several paragraphs of the resolution dealt with the role of MINUSTAH assisting Haiti in these respects, including reform and human rights, though the Haitian people themselves were responsible for achieving these aims. Furthermore, international institutions were urged to continue to provide donations previously pledged to Haiti.

=== Acts ===
Under Chapter VII of the United Nations Charter, the Council extended the mandate of MINUSTAH with the intention of further renewals. The Secretary-General Kofi Annan was requested to report on a possible restructuring of the MINUSTAH peacekeeping operation to support reform after consultations with the new Haitian government.

== See also ==
- 2004 Haitian coup d'état
- List of United Nations Security Council Resolutions 1601 to 1700 (2005–2006)
