= Urano Bacelar =

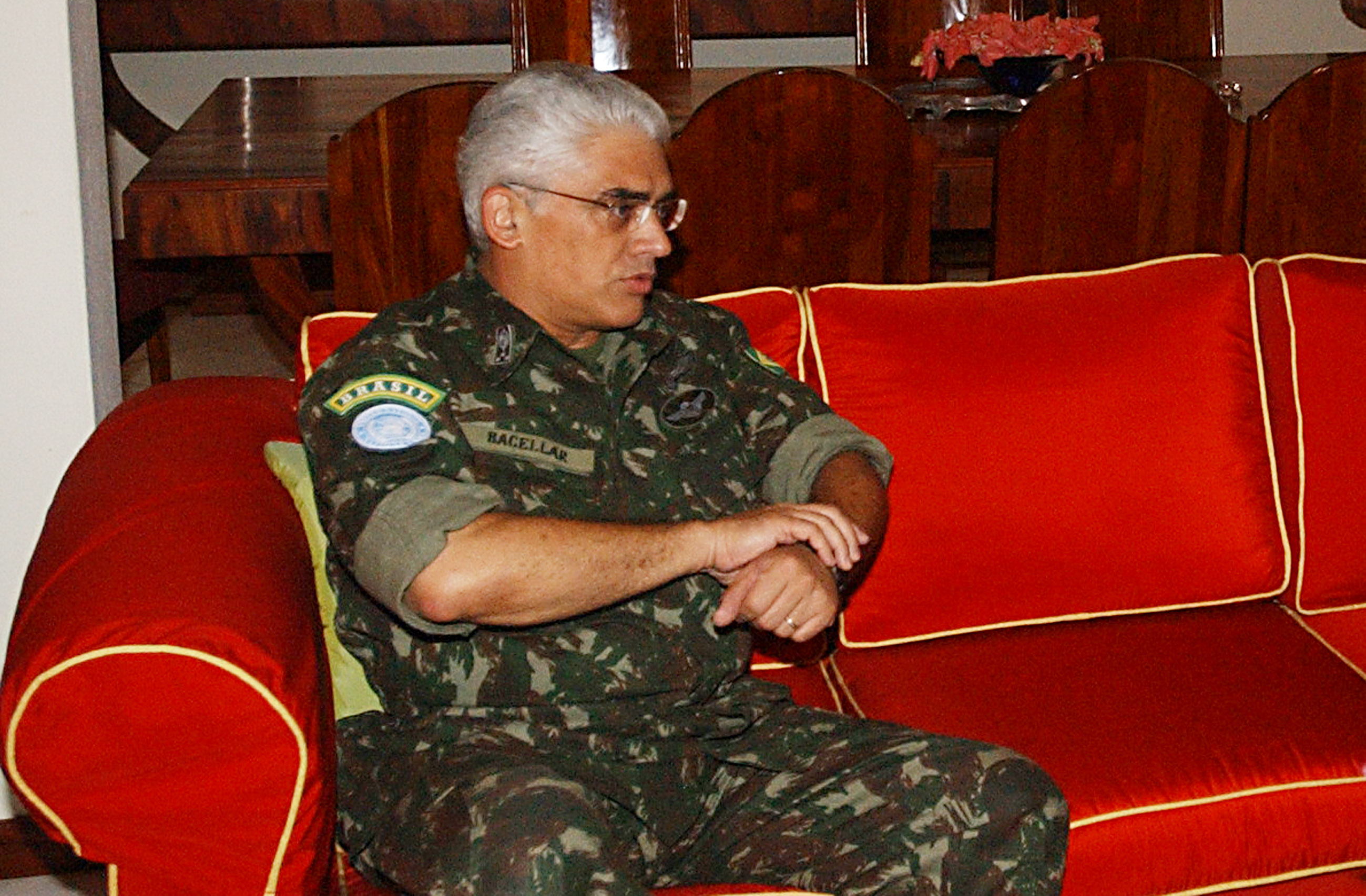
Urano Bacelar

Lieutenant-General Urano Teixeira da Matta Bacellar (1947 – 6 January, 2006) was a Brazilian military man. He was born in Bagé, in the state of Rio Grande do Sul. He served for 39 years in the Brazilian Army and eventually rose to the rank of Lieutenant-General. He was married and had two children.

On 1 September 2005, he was selected to lead the military contingent of MINUSTAH, the UN peacekeeping force in Haiti, replacing his fellow Brazilian Lieutenant-General Augusto Heleno Ribeiro Pereira.

Graduated at the Agulhas Negras Military Academy, in which he would later lecture, he was a decorated officer.

On 7 January 2006, Bacellar was found dead, fallen from a chair on the balcony of his hotel room in Port-au-Prince. State news agency Agência Brasil reported he was the victim of "a firearms accident". Later that day, UN and Brazilian officials said that he appeared to have shot himself in the head, several days after national elections in Haiti had been postponed for a fourth time. He was 58 years old. An autopsy was performed to determine the exact cause of death and the caliber of the weapon and on 12 January 2006, both the UN and the Brazilian government announced suicide as the official cause of death.

In January 2011, diplomatic cables from 2005 and 2006 released in the United States diplomatic cables leak, revealed that Dominican Republic President Leonel Fernández suspected Bacellar had been assassinated by a group of contras led by Guy Philippe, a former soldier and police chief and a Haitian anti-Aristide "rebel" leader that had been armed by the USA.

The same cables also reveal that the contras, according to President Fernandez, had the mandate of creating chaos in Haiti and had even killed a Canadian and a Jordanian MINUSTAH member in the past and that the killing could have been a response to Bacellar's reluctance to use force in Haiti's shanty town Cité Soleil regardless of pressure from Washington and a pressure campaign by the Chamber of Commerce head Reginald Boulos and André Apaid, the latter a sweatshop king in Haiti and both main figures in the civic front named Group 184 that played a main role in ousting President Aristide in the 2004 coup.

His position as leader of the military contingent of MINUSTAH was temporarily filled by his deputy, Chilean General Eduardo Aldunate Herman. On 17 January 2006, it was announced that Brazilian General Augusto Heleno Ribeiro Pereira would be the permanent replacement for Bacellar as the head of the United Nations' Haiti military force.

His body was returned to Brasília to burial with full military honors in Rio de Janeiro.

== Awards ==
- United Nations Medal (MINUSTAH - Haiti) (United Nations)
