= United Nations Security Council Resolution 1892 =

UN Security Council Resolution 1892
- Date: 13 October 2009
- Meeting no.: 6,200
- Code: S/RES/1892 (Document)
- Subject: The question concerning Haiti
- Voting summary: 15 voted for; None voted against; None abstained
- Result: Adopted

Security Council composition
- Permanent members: China; France; Russia; United Kingdom; United States
- Non-permanent members: Austria; Burkina Faso; Costa Rica; Croatia; Japan; Libya; Mexico; Turkey; Uganda; Vietnam

United Nations Security Council Resolution 1892 was unanimously adopted on 13 October 2009.

== Resolution ==
The Security Council this morning extended the mandate of the United Nations Stabilization Mission in Haiti through 15 October 2010 and adjusted its force configuration to better meet current requirements on the ground.

Unanimously adopting resolution 1892 (2009) and acting under Chapter VII of the Charter of the United Nations, the Council decided that the United Nations Stabilization Mission in Haiti (MINUSTAH) would consist of a military component of up to 6,940 troops and a police component of up to 2,211 police. The council also expressed its intention to further renew the Mission.

The council's decision endorsed the recommendation made by Secretary-General Ban Ki-moon in his recent report (S/2009/439), which noted that the role of the MINUSTAH police and military components would need to adapt as the threats facing Haiti evolved, and as the country developed its own security capacity. While it was clear that current force levels would have to be maintained to avoid any major reversals, the Secretary-General said it would also be desirable to make some adjustments to enhance MINUSTAH's operational ability to deploy rapidly and to monitor remote locations, including border areas and Haiti's coastline.

For its part, the Security Council reaffirmed its call on MINUSTAH to support the political process under way, to promote an all-inclusive political dialogue and national reconciliation, and to provide logistical and security assistance for the upcoming elections in 2010. The Council invited Member States, including neighbouring and regional States, to strengthen their engagement with the Haitian Government to address cross-border illicit trafficking of persons, in particular children, and the trafficking of drugs, arms and other illegal activities.

After adoption, the representative of Haiti expressed the “most heartfelt sympathy” of his Government and the people of Haiti to the United Nations and the family, friends and colleagues of the “valiant, talented and dedicated” MINUSTAH officers from Uruguay and Jordan who died in the terrible plane crash on Friday, 9 October.

== See also ==
- List of United Nations Security Council Resolutions 1801 to 1900 (2008–2009)
