= United Nations Security Council Resolution 1780 =

UN Security Council Resolution 1780
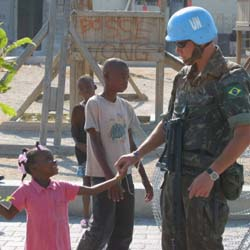
- Brazilian MINUSTAH soldier with a Haitian girl in February 2005
- Date: 15 October 2007
- Meeting no.: 5,758
- Code: S/RES/1780 (Document)
- Subject: The question concerning Haiti
- Voting summary: 15 voted for; None voted against; None abstained
- Result: Adopted

Security Council composition
- Permanent members: China; France; Russia; United Kingdom; United States
- Non-permanent members: Belgium; Rep. of the Congo; Ghana; Indonesia; Italy; Panama; Peru; Qatar; Slovakia; South Africa

United Nations Security Council Resolution 1780 was unanimously adopted on 15 October 2007.

== Resolution ==
Affirming that the security situation in Haiti had improved but remained fragile, the Security Council today extended the mandate of the United Nations Stabilisation Mission in Haiti in the country (MINUSTAH) for one year, while endorsing the Secretary-General’s recommendations to reconfigure its deployment.

Through resolution 1780 (2007), adopted unanimously, the Council decided that MINUSTAH should be extended until 15 October 2008, and that its military force level be reduced and its police component increased, in order to help the Mission better support the Haitian National Police to consolidate security gains in urban areas. The military component would then consist of 7,060 personnel, while the police component would go up to 2,091.

Through the text, the Council also called on MINUSTAH to assist the Government to pursue comprehensive border management, underlining the need for coordinated international support in the effort.

In addition, it requested the Mission to expand its support to the Government’s efforts to strengthen State institutions at all levels, especially key ministries and agencies outside Port-au-Prince.

== See also ==
- List of United Nations Security Council Resolutions 1701 to 1800 (2006–2008)
