= United Nations Security Council Resolution 1840 =

UN Security Council Resolution 1840
- Date: 14 October 2008
- Meeting no.: 5,993
- Code: S/RES/1840 (Document)
- Subject: The situation concerning Haiti
- Voting summary: 15 voted for; None voted against; None abstained
- Result: Adopted

Security Council composition
- Permanent members: China; France; Russia; United Kingdom; United States
- Non-permanent members: Burkina Faso; Belgium; Costa Rica; Croatia; Indonesia; Italy; Libya; Panama; South Africa; Vietnam

United Nations Security Council Resolution 1840 was unanimously adopted on 14 October 2008.

== Resolution ==
The Security Council decided this morning to extend the mandate of the United Nations Stabilization Mission in Haiti (MINUSTAH) until 15 October 2009, with the intention of further renewal.

Unanimously adopting resolution 1840 (2008) under Chapter VII of the United Nations Charter, the Council endorsed the Secretary-General's recommendation to maintain the Mission's current configuration until the planned substantial increase of the Haitian National Police capacity, therefore deciding that MINUSTAH would continue to consist of a military component of up to 7,060 troops and a total police component of 2,091.

The Council called upon MINUSTAH to support the political process under way and, in cooperation with the Government, to promote an all-inclusive political dialogue and national reconciliation, and to provide logistical and security assistance for the upcoming elections. It also called upon the Mission to expand its support to strengthen self-sustaining State institutions, especially outside Port-au-Prince, the capital.

By other terms of the text, the Council requested that MINUSTAH continue its support of the Haitian National Police and remain engaged in helping the Government reform and restructure the force. It invited Member States, including neighbouring and regional countries, to engage with the Government in addressing cross-border illicit trafficking of persons, drugs, arms and other illegal activities, and to contribute to strengthening the capacity of the Haiti National Police in those areas.

According to the text, the Council urged the United Nations country team and all stakeholders to enhance security and development efforts with initiatives aimed at significantly enhancing the living standards of affected populations. Additionally, it mandated MINUSTAH to sustain its implementation of rapid-impact projects.

The Council further requested MINUSTAH to continue to pursue its community violence reduction approach, including by supporting the National Commission on Disarmament, Dismantlement and Reintegration and concentrating its efforts on labour-intensive projects, development of a weapons registry, revision of laws on the importation and possession of arms, reform of the weapons permit system and the promotion of a national community policing doctrine.

== See also ==
- List of United Nations Security Council Resolutions 1801 to 1900 (2008–2009)
