= United Nations Security Council Resolution 1743 =

UN Security Council Resolution 1743
- Date: 15 February 2007
- Meeting no.: 5,631
- Code: S/RES/1743 (Document)
- Subject: The question concerning Haiti
- Voting summary: 15 voted for; None voted against; None abstained
- Result: Adopted

Security Council composition
- Permanent members: China; France; Russia; United Kingdom; United States
- Non-permanent members: Belgium; Rep. of the Congo; Ghana; Indonesia; Italy; Panama; Peru; Qatar; Slovakia; South Africa

United Nations Security Council Resolution 1743 was unanimously adopted on 15 February 2007.

== Resolution ==
Unanimously adopting draft resolution 1743 (2007) and acting under Chapter VII of the Charter, the Council requested that MINUSTAH continue the increased operations in support of the Haitian National Police against armed gangs, notably in Port-au-Prince. It also reaffirmed MINUSTAH's mandate to provide operational support to the Haitian coast guard.

By the terms of the resolution, the Council called upon the Mission to support the constitutional and political process under way in Haiti and to promote all-inclusive dialogue and national reconciliation. It requested the Mission to continue to implement quick-impact projects and, in that context, to accelerate its reorientation of disarmament, demobilization and reintegration resources towards a comprehensive community violence reduction programme.

The Council deplored and condemned in the strongest terms any attack against personnel from MINUSTAH, demanding that no acts of violence or intimidation be directed against United Nations and associated personnel and other international and humanitarian organizations. The council also condemned strongly the grave violations against children affected by armed violence, as well as widespread rape and other sexual abuse of girls.

After adoption of the resolution, China's representative said MINUSTAH's central task for the upcoming phase was to assist Haiti in its transition from peacekeeping to peacebuilding. With the needs for security and safety largely met, the Haitian people had a growing demand for improved living conditions, a revitalized reconciliation process, economic development, social justice and the rule of law. For those reasons, China had proposed, among other things, to extend the mandate for six months, and had requested the Secretary-General to conduct an assessment on the changed situation and security risk in Haiti, so that the council could formulate a viable long-term strategy before deciding the next extension of the Mission's mandate.

== See also ==
- List of United Nations Security Council Resolutions 1701 to 1800 (2006–2008)
