= Sandra Honoré =

Sandra Honoré is a Trinidadian and Tobagonian diplomat who served as the United Nations special representative and head of the United Nations Stabilization Mission in Haiti (MINUSTAH). She was appointed to this position by United Nations Secretary-General Ban Ki-moon on 31 May 2013. and served until the MINUSTAH's mandate expired on October 15, 2017. In 2000-2005, she was chief of staff to the assistant secretary general of the Organization of American States (OAS).

== Biography ==
Born in Tunapuna, Trinidad and Tobago, in 1955, she is married and has one child. After graduating in modern languages from Besançon and Bordeaux Universities (France) and obtaining diplomas in international relations from the University of the West Indies (Trinidad and Tobago) and in Conference Interpretation from the Polytechnic of Central London, Honoré served the government of Trinidad and Tobago in many capacities, including service in embassies in Brazil and in the United States of America. She was ambassador to Costa Rica until August 2012, with concurrent accreditation to Guatemala and Panama, and held a number of positions in the Foreign Service, including chief of protocol of the Foreign Ministry in 2007 and director of the Caribbean Community (CARICOM) and Caribbean Affairs Division in 2005. She was also special assistant to the chief of the OAS Electoral Observation Mission to Haiti from 1995 to 1996.
