= United Nations Security Council Resolution 1608 =

UN Security Council Resolution 1608
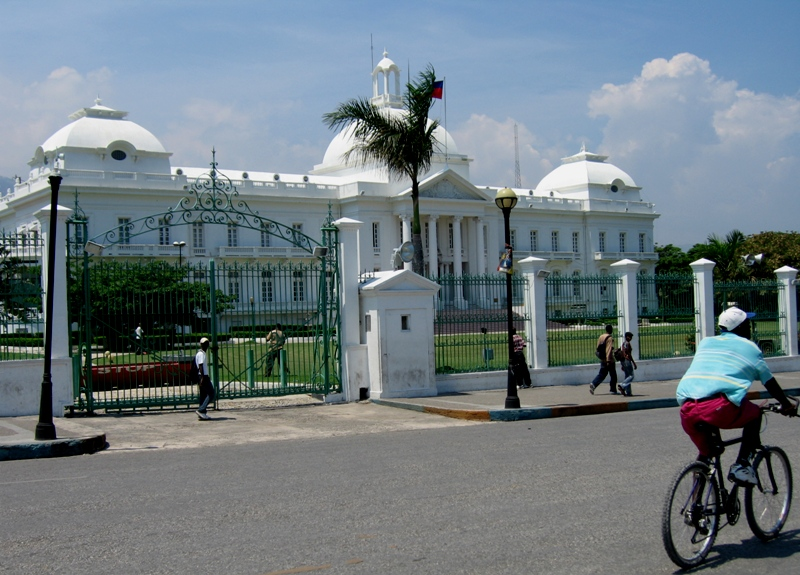
- Presidential palace in Port-au-Prince
- Date: 22 June 2005
- Meeting no.: 5,210
- Code: S/RES/1608 (Document)
- Subject: The question concerning Haiti
- Voting summary: 15 voted for; None voted against; None abstained
- Result: Adopted

Security Council composition
- Permanent members: China; France; Russia; United Kingdom; United States
- Non-permanent members: Algeria; Argentina; Benin; Brazil; Denmark; Greece; Japan; Philippines; Romania; Tanzania

United Nations Security Council Resolution 1608, adopted unanimously on 22 June 2005, after recalling resolutions 1542 (2004) and 1576 (2004) on the situation in Haiti, the Council extended the mandate of the United Nations Stabilisation Mission in Haiti (MINUSTAH) until 15 February 2006 and increased its strength.

== Resolution ==
=== Observations ===
In the preamble of the resolution, the council stressed the importance of holding elections in 2005, with a government taking office on 7 February 2006. All violations of human rights were condemned, and the transitional government called upon to end impunity and ensure that the rule of law was respected. The council also noted the poverty in Haiti and called for the strengthening of the economy.

=== Acts ===
Under Chapter VII of the United Nations Charter, the council extended the mandate of MINUSTAH and an increase in its strength. It supported the recommendations of the Secretary-General Kofi Annan of the creation of a 750-strong rapid reaction force, 50 personnel for the headquarters in the capital Port-au-Prince, 275 personnel for the police component in addition to troops already authorised and a review of the justice system. For a temporary period, MINUSTAH would consist of 7,500 military and 1,897 police personnel.

The remainder of the resolution called for further reforms, addressed international assistance, and co-operation between MINUSTAH and the Haitian transitional government. Continuous reports on the situation in Haiti by the secretary-general were also requested by the council.

== See also ==
- 2004 Haitian coup d'état
- List of United Nations Security Council Resolutions 1601 to 1700 (2005–2006)
