= Nigel Fisher (United Nations) =

Former UN Assistant Secretary-General

Dr. Nigel Fisher
- Citizenship: Canadian
- Occupations: Crisis management and response
- Organization: United Nations
- Title: United Nations Assistant Secretary-General
- Awards: The Order of Ontario, The Order of Canada

== Early years ==
Born in Hereford UK, Nigel Fisher graduated with a B.A. degree from the University of Wales and obtained an M.A. in political science from McMaster University in Hamilton, Ontario, Canada, where he met his wife Jennifer. After becoming Canadians, they both worked with the Canadian University Service Overseas in Nigeria and in Ottawa.

== Career highlights ==
After working with Canada’s International Development Research Centre in Ottawa, Fisher began his United Nations career with Unicef in Laos in 1977, before moving on to India, Mozambique and then as the agency’s Representative in the People’s Democratic Republic of Yemen. In 1988, he was appointed Deputy Executive Secretary of the World Conference on Education for All (Jomtien, Thailand, 1990), following which he became Unicef’s Deputy Regional Director for the Middle East and North Africa and Area Representative for Jordan, Syria, the Occupied Territories and Djibouti. In 1994, he was appointed Unicef’s Special Representative for Rwanda and Great Lakes, to lead Unicef’s post-genocide reconstruction operations. He then became director of the organisation’s Office for Emergency Operations and was influential in the development of Unicef’s Anti-war Agenda. Following a sabbatical year working on the issue of children affected by armed conflict, as Visiting UN Fellow at the Canadian Centre for Foreign Policy Development, in Canada’s then-Department of Foreign Affairs and International Trade, he became Unicef’s Regional Director for South Asia. Immediately after the attack on New York’s World Trade Center on 11 September 2001, Fisher was appointed Unicef’s Special Representative for Afghanistan and border areas.

In early 2002, he was appointed by the UN Secretary-General as Deputy Special Representative of the Secretary-General in the United Nations Assistance Mission in Afghanistan (UNAMA), at the rank of Assistant Secretary-General. He was simultaneously Designated UN Security Official, UN Resident Coordinator and Humanitarian Coordinator, coordinating the humanitarian and reconstruction operations of UN agencies and their partners. His next appointment was as Director of the United Nations Office for Project Services (UNOPS), again at the rank of Assistant Secretary-General.

After leaving the United Nations in 2005, he was appointed President and CEO of Unicef Canada. Under his leadership, Unicef Canada published a landmark report on the discrimination, health challenges and health care obstacles faced by Canada’s aboriginal children. In April 2010, he was recalled by the United Nations to assume the role of acting Deputy Special Representative of the Secretary-General in the United Nations Stabilisation Mission in Haiti (MINUSTAH), Resident UN Coordinator and Humanitarian Coordinator. In July 2010, he was confirmed in the position, which he occupied until early 2013, when the Secretary-General appointed him as acting Special Representative of the Secretary-General, overseeing all MINUSTAH operations in Haiti. His final UN appointment was as the Regional UN Humanitarian Coordinator for the Syria Crisis, based in Amman, Jordan.

Since leaving the UN, Fisher has acted as a consultant to the United Nations, including to the World Humanitarian Summit (2014), to Governments in Asia and the South Pacific on disaster preparedness and post-disaster recovery, as well as to several foundations. He has been a board director and advisor for a number of international philanthropic organizations and business enterprises. Fisher has also had cameo acting roles in two films directed by Sean Penn: as Ivan in The Last Face (2016) and as Dr. Halstead in Flag Day (2021)

Fisher is currently an Adjunct Professor in the Faculty of Applied Science at the University of British Columbia, Canada.

== Honors and affiliations ==
Nigel Fisher is an Officer of the Order of Canada, a member of the Order of Ontario and has been awarded Canada’s Meritorious Service Cross (M.S.C.), the Pearson Peace Medal, the Canadian Medical Association’s Medal of Honour and the Queen Elizabeth II Diamond Jubilee Medal. He holds an honorary LL.D. degree from McMaster University, his alma mater, where he has also been appointed to the Alumni Gallery.

== Publications ==
Fara, M.S. and Fisher, N. (1988). The 1984 Literacy Campaign in the People’s Democratic Republic of Yemen: A Case Study. UNESCO, Unicef, WFP Cooperative Programme. UNESCO Paris, 1988.

Fisher, N. (1998). Children in Armed Conflict and Canada’s Foreign Policy Agenda. In Canadian Foreign Policy Journal, Vol. 6, No.1 (Fall 1998), Ottawa, pp. 105–111.

Fisher, N. (2002). Commitment to Children – The Track Record. In Himal South Asia, January 2002, Kathmandu, pp. 56–57.

Fisher, N. (2000). Communication for Development and Social Change. In Media Asia, Vol. 27 – Issue 1 (2000), AMIC Manila, pp. 33–35.

Fisher, N. (1989). Concern resurges in global crisis. In Focus: Basic Education, UNICEF Intercom No.52, April 1989, New York, pp. 1,2,6.

Fisher, N. (2002). Leadership and Impunity: The Politics Behind the Traumatization of Children During Armed Conflicts. In Traumatology Vol. 8 No.3, Special Issue: Children and War. September 2002, pp. 146–159.

Fisher, N. (2001). Lederskap og straffefrihet – politikken bak traumatisering av barn under vaepnede konflikter. In Dyregrov D., Lorontzen G., Raaheim K. (eds.) Et Liv For Barn – Utfordringer, omsorg og hjelpetiltak. Bergen: Fagbokforlaget, 2001, pp. 222–237.

Fisher, N. (1999). Mediating for Children: Child Protection in Armed Conflicts. In Cahill K.M. (ed.) A Framework for Survival: Health, Human Rights and Humanitarian Assistance in Conflicts and Disasters (rev). London, Routledge 1999, pp. 60–95.

Fisher, N. (2014). The inheritance of loss. In Forced Migration Review 47, September 2014, pp. 4–5.

Fisher, N. (1974). The Potters of Buan. In Tactile, May–June 1974, pp. 8–9. The Canadian Guild of Potters.

Haddad W.D., Colletta N.J., Fisher N., Lakin M., Sutton M., Windham D. (1990). Meeting Basic Learning Needs: A Vision for the 1990s. The Inter-Agency Commission for the World Conference on Education for All, New York, April 1990.
