= United Nations Security Council Resolution 1576 =

UN Security Council Resolution 1576
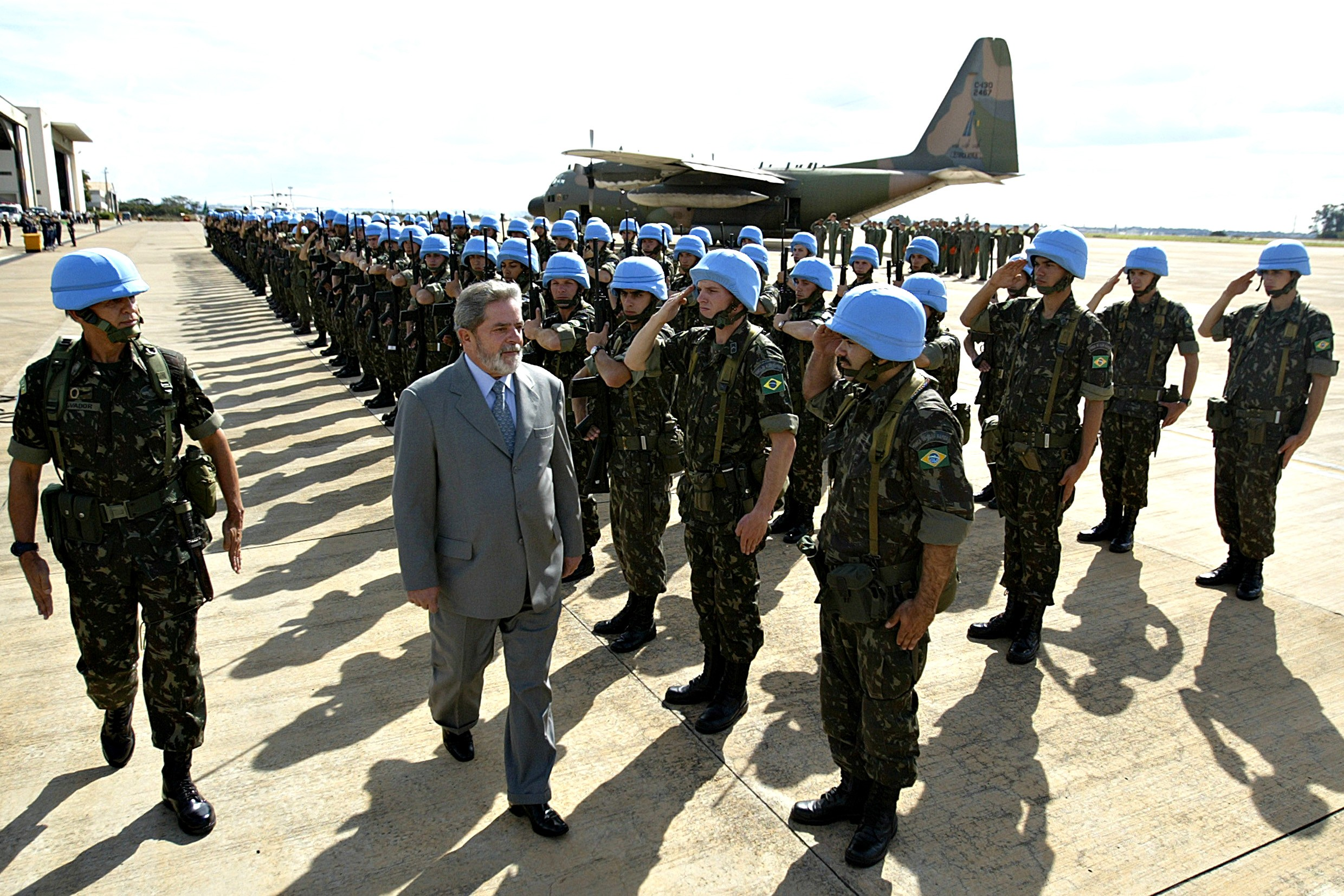
- Brazilian peacekeepers in Haiti (2004)
- Date: 29 November 2004
- Meeting no.: 5,090
- Code: S/RES/1576 (Document)
- Subject: The situation in Haiti
- Voting summary: 15 voted for; None voted against; None abstained
- Result: Adopted

Security Council composition
- Permanent members: China; France; Russia; United Kingdom; United States
- Non-permanent members: Algeria; Angola; Benin; Brazil; Chile; Germany; Pakistan; Philippines; Romania; Spain

United Nations Security Council Resolution 1576, adopted unanimously on 29 November 2004, after recalling resolutions 1529 (2004) and 1542 (2004) on the situation in Haiti, the Council extended the mandate of the United Nations Stabilisation Mission in Haiti (MINUSTAH) until 1 June 2005.

The preamble of the resolution underlined the need for political reconciliation and economic reconstruction in the country. It condemned acts of violence, violations of human rights and attempts by some armed groups to conduct unauthorised law enforcement in the country, which had to be disarmed as soon as possible.

Acting under Chapter VII of the United Nations Charter, the Council extended the mandate of MINUSTAH, to be renewed if necessary. The transitional government in Haiti was called upon to build an inclusive democratic and electoral process. International contributions were requested by the council, which asked the Secretary-General Kofi Annan to report every three months on the implementation of MINUSTAH's mandate.

== See also ==
- 2004 Haitian coup d'état
- List of United Nations Security Council Resolutions 1501 to 1600 (2003–2005)
