= United Nations Security Council Resolution 1542 =

UN Security Council Resolution 1542
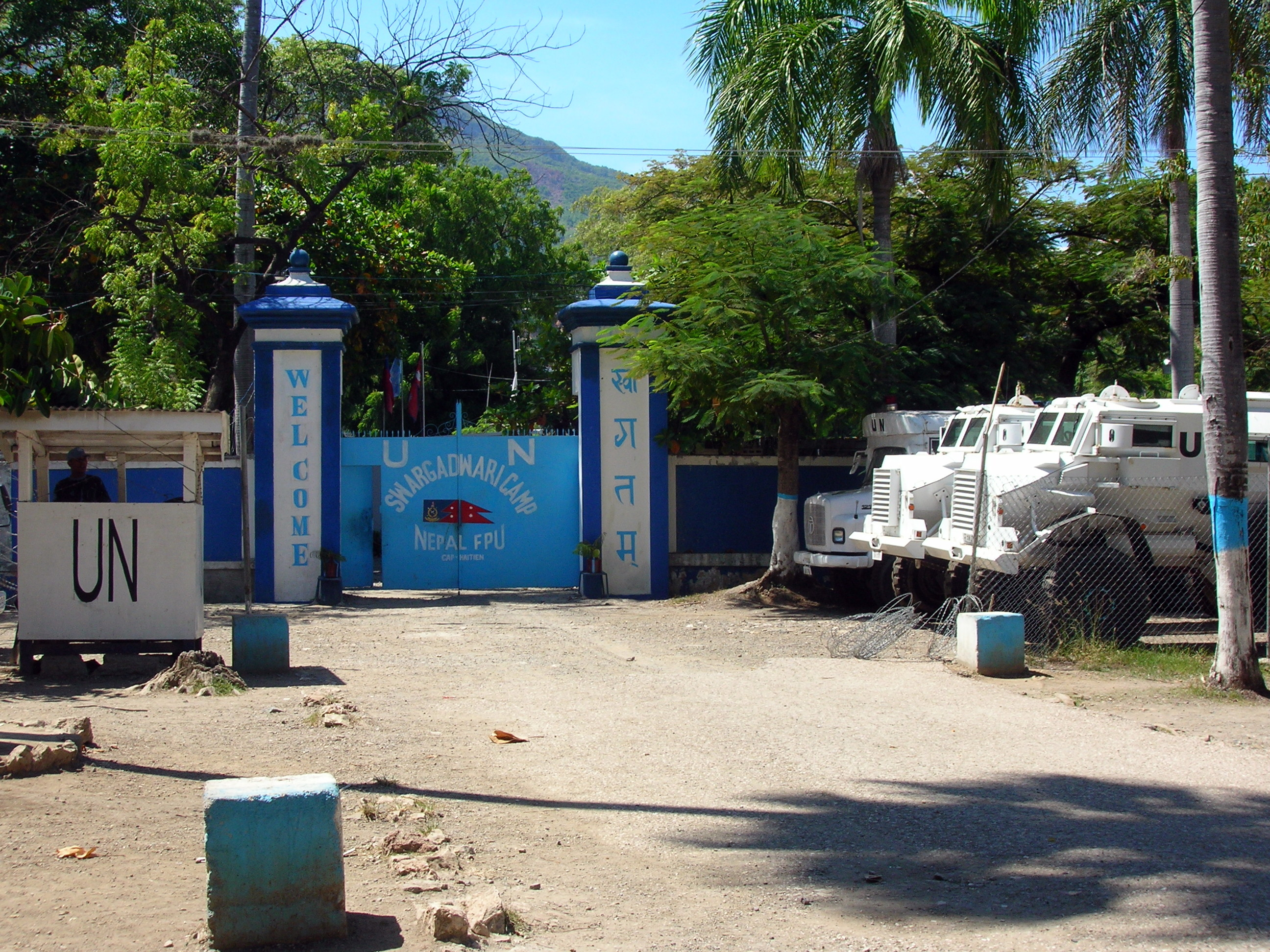
- A MINUSTAH base in Haiti
- Date: 30 April 2004
- Meeting no.: 4,961
- Code: S/RES/1542 (Document)
- Subject: The situation in Haiti
- Voting summary: 15 voted for; None voted against; None abstained
- Result: Adopted

Security Council composition
- Permanent members: China; France; Russia; United Kingdom; United States
- Non-permanent members: Algeria; Angola; Benin; Brazil; Chile; Germany; Pakistan; Philippines; Romania; Spain

United Nations Security Council Resolution 1542, adopted unanimously on 30 April 2004, after receiving a report by Secretary-General Kofi Annan, the council deplored all violations of human rights in Haiti and urged the Government of Haiti to promote and protect human rights with a State based on the rule of law and independent judiciary.

The council also reiterated its call for long-term international assistance to Haiti, welcoming action and support from the Organization of American States (OAS), the Caribbean Community (CARICOM), and financial institutions.

Noting the situation in Haiti, the resolution established the United Nations Stabilization Mission in Haiti (MINUSTAH) and called for Resolution 1529 (2004) for an initial period of six months to be renewed for further periods. In accordance with the Secretary-General's report, the council decided MINUSTAH would consist of a civilian and a military component which would cooperate with the OAS, CARICOM, and other organisations.

The resolution sets out the mandate of MINUSTAH in areas that include providing a secure and stable environment, promoting human rights, and supporting the political process in Haiti.

The Force consists of troops from up to 17 countries, including Argentina, Bolivia, Canada, Jordan, France, South Korea, and the United States, and police from 41 countries, including Argentina, Bangladesh, Brazil, Egypt, Russia, and Spain.

Resolution 1542 was commended as improving previous policing mandates due to its clarity and integration of policing into a broad rule of law framework.

== See also ==
- 2004 Haitian coup d'état
- List of United Nations Security Council Resolutions 1501 to 1600 (2003–2005)
