= United Nations Stabilisation Mission in Haiti =

2004–2017 United Nations peacekeeping mission in Haiti

United Nations Stabilization Mission in Haiti

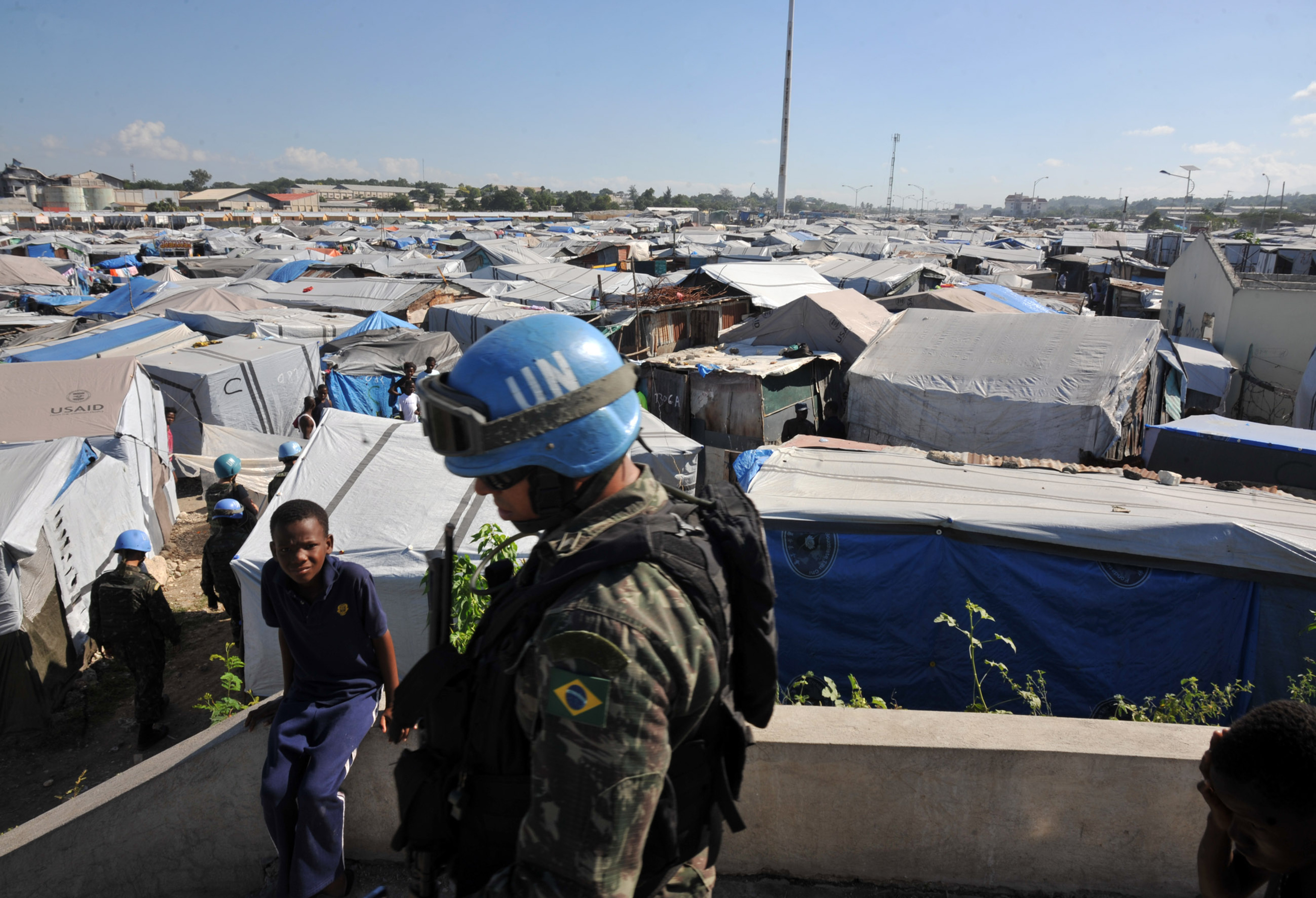
- Brazilian soldiers patrol the camp Jean Marie Vincent in Port-au-Prince, Haiti
- Abbreviation: MINUSTAH (French: Mission des Nations Unies pour la stabilisation en Haïti)
- Formation: 1 June 2004
- Dissolved: 13 April 2017
- Type: Peacekeeping mission
- Legal status: Replaced by MINUJUSTH
- Head: Sandra Honoré (Special Representative of the Secretary-General)
- Parent organization: UN Department of Peacekeeping Operations, United Nations Security Council
- Website: UN Peacekeeping: MINUSTAH

The United Nations Stabilisation Mission in Haiti (French: Mission des Nations Unies pour la stabilisation en Haïti; Haitian Creole: Misyon Nasyon Zini pou Estabilizasyon an Ayiti), also known as MINUSTAH, an acronym of its French name, was a UN peacekeeping mission in Haiti from 2004 to 2017. It was composed of 2,366 military personnel and 2,533 police, supported by international civilian personnel, a local civilian staff, and United Nations Volunteers. The mission's military component was led by the Brazilian Army and commanded by Brazilian officials.

The devastating January 2010 Haiti earthquake destroyed MINUSTAH's headquarters in Port-au-Prince and killed its chief, Hédi Annabi of Tunisia, his deputy Luiz Carlos da Costa of Brazil, and the acting police commissioner, RCMP Supt. Doug Coates of Canada. The mission subsequently concentrated on assisting the Haitian National Police in providing security, while American and Canadian military forces distributed and facilitated humanitarian aid. Due to fears of instability following the earthquake, United Nations Security Council Resolution 1944 extended MINUSTAH's mandate, and it was periodically renewed until 2017.

Though effective in halting widespread violence, building a national police force, and stabilizing Haiti, the mission was troubled from the start by some Haitians' objections to encroachment on their nation's sovereignty, then by the deadly introduction of cholera by Nepalese peacekeepers (ultimately killing over 9,000 Haitians), and by various allegations of human rights abuses, and sexual exploitation and abuse of Haitians (including children), by MINUSTAH personnel.

On April 13, 2017, amid growing controversy over the conduct of the mission and its personnel, the United Nations Security Council announced that the mission would end in October 2017. It was replaced by a much smaller follow-up mission, the United Nations Mission for Justice Support in Haiti (MINUJUSTH), which itself concluded in 2019.

== Background ==
MINUSTAH was established by United Nations Security Council Resolution 1542 on 30 April 2004 because the Security Council deemed the situation in Haiti to be a threat to international peace and security in the region. According to its mandate from the UN Security Council, MINUSTAH was required to concentrate the use of its resources, including civilian police, on increasing security and protection during the electoral period and to assist with the restoration and maintenance of the rule of law, public safety and public order in Haiti. In 2004, UN peacekeepers entered Cité Soleil in an attempt to gain control of the area and restore stability.

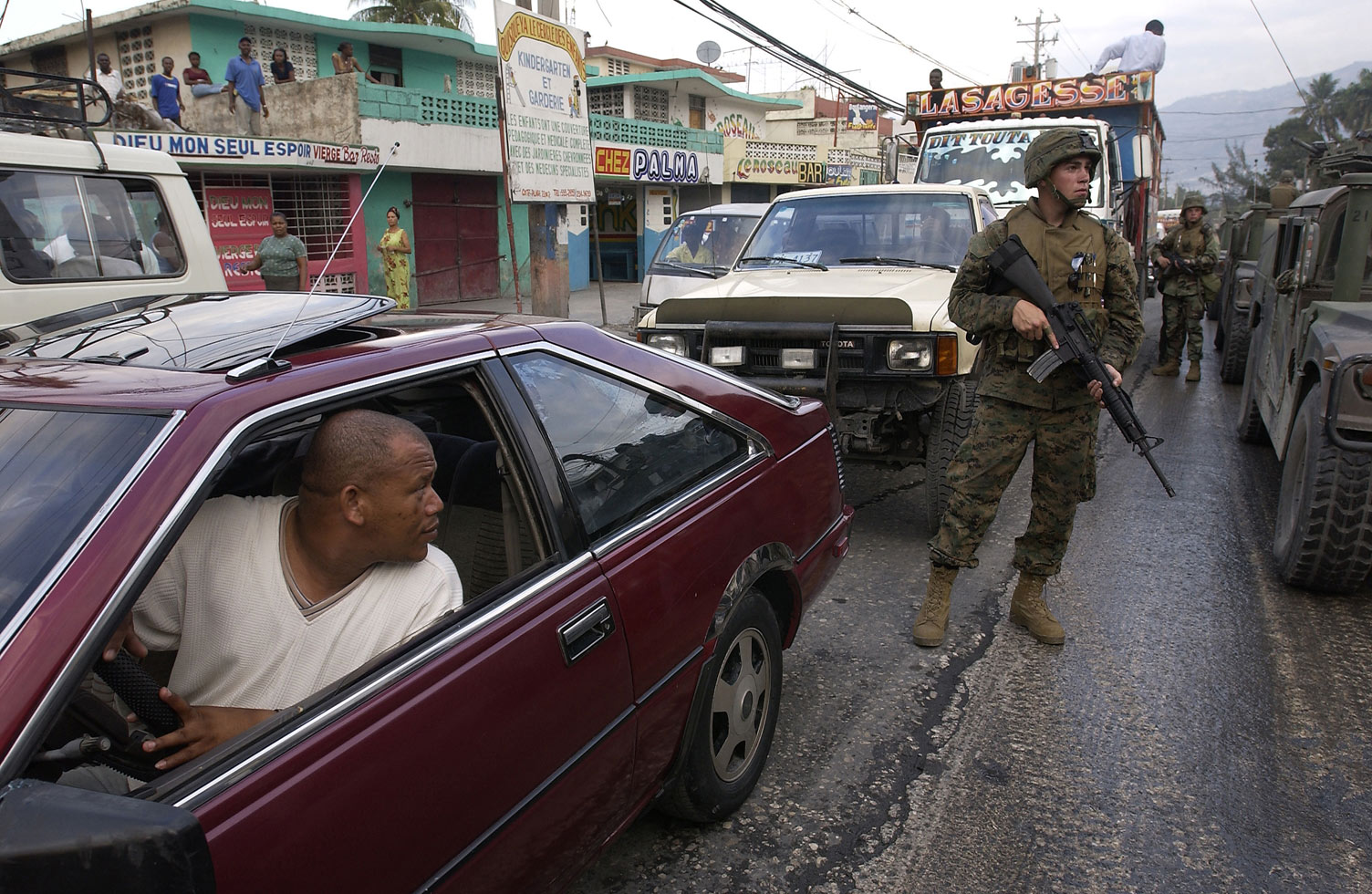
U.S. Marines patrol the streets of Port-au-Prince in March 2004.

The President of Guatemala also sent a small police delegation attached to TOMINUSHTA as translators.

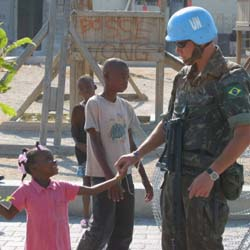
Brazilian MINUSTAH soldier with a Haitian girl in February 2005

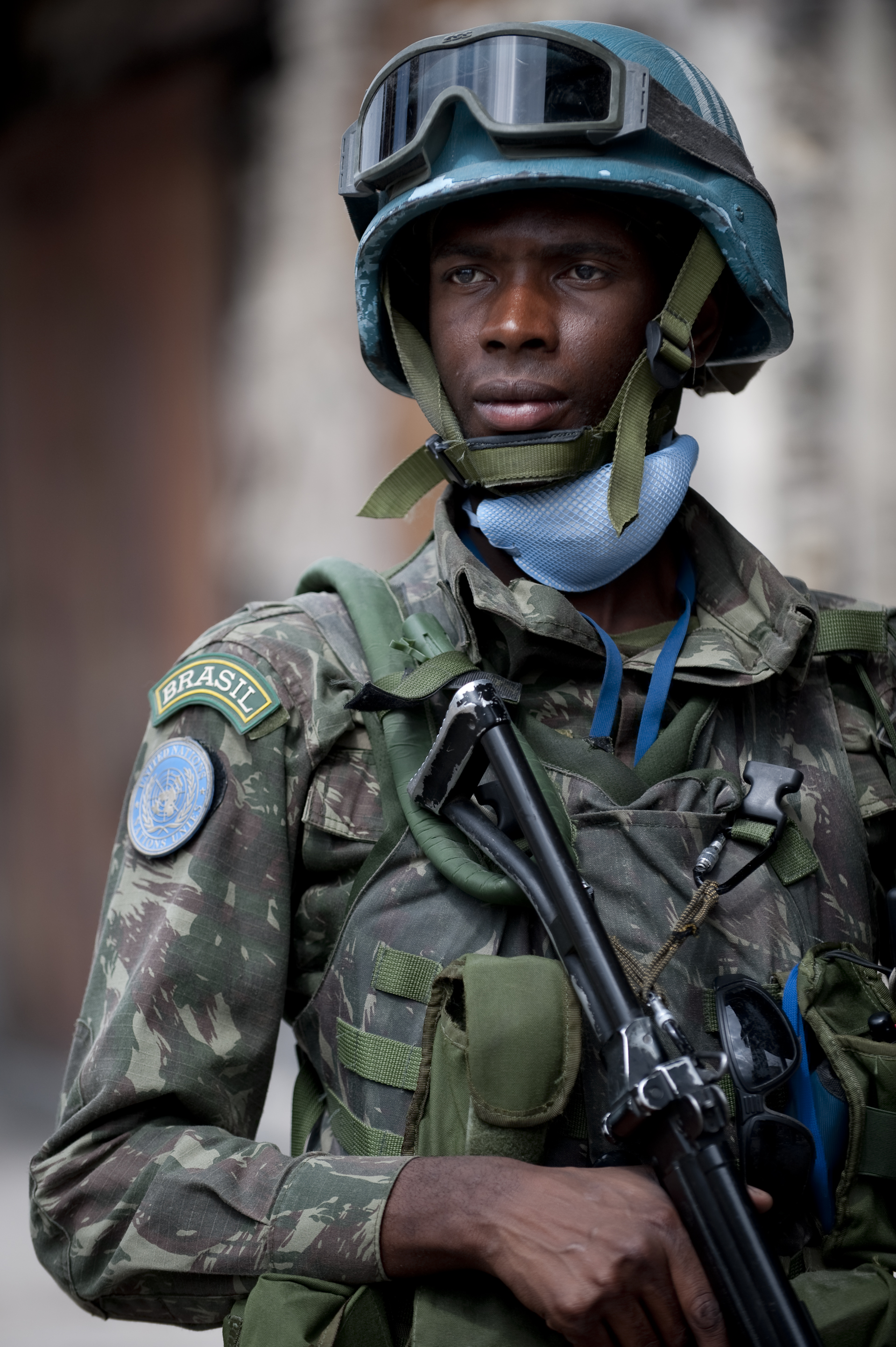
Brazilian soldier stands security in Port-au-Prince

Independent human rights organizations accused the Haitian National Police (HNP) and sometimes MINUSTAH of atrocities against civilians. It is still argued if any, or how many civilians were killed as a by-product of MINUSTAH crackdowns on criminals operating from slums. The UN and MINUSTAH expressed deep regret for any loss of life during operations.

In early 2005, MINUSTAH force commander Lieutenant-General Augusto Heleno Ribeiro Pereira testified which was never aired publicly at a congressional commission in Brazil that "we are under extreme pressure from the international community to use violence", citing Canada, France, and the United States. Having ended his tour of duty, on 1 September 2005, Heleno was replaced by General Urano Teixeira da Matta Bacellar as force commander of MINUSTAH. On 7 January 2006, Bacellar was found dead in his hotel room; the Federal District's coroner's office concluded that the death was caused by a self-inflicted 9mm gunshot wound to the palate, though Dominican president Leonel Fernandez was shown to have expressed skepticism in leaked diplomatic cables. His interim replacement was Chilean General Eduardo Aldunate Hermann.

On 17 January 2006, it was announced that Brazilian General José Elito Carvalho Siqueira would be the permanent replacement for Bacellar as the head of the United Nations' Haiti force.

On 14 February 2006, in its Resolution 1658, the United Nations Security Council extended MINUSTAH's mandate until 15 August 2006.

MINUSTAH is also a precedent as the first mission in the region to be led by the Brazilian and Chilean military, and almost entirely composed of, Latin American forces, particularly from Brazil, Argentina, Chile, Bolivia, Ecuador and Uruguay. From 1 September 2007 until his death following the earthquake on 12 January 2010, the mission was led by Tunisian Hédi Annabi.

India provided three units of around 500 police personnel for MINUSTAH. The Indian contingent joined the mission in October 2008, and were stationed in Port-au-Prince and Hinche. They were tasked with maintaining law and order, setting up and operating checkpoints, and anti-crime operations. Two Indian police units remained in Haiti after MINUSTAH ended on 15 October 2017, to serve in the successor mission, the United Nations Mission for Justice Support in Haiti (MINUJUSTH).

== United Nations reports and resolutions ==
On 23 February 2004, the United Nations Security Council was convened at the request of CARICOM for the first time in four years to address the deteriorating situation in Haiti.

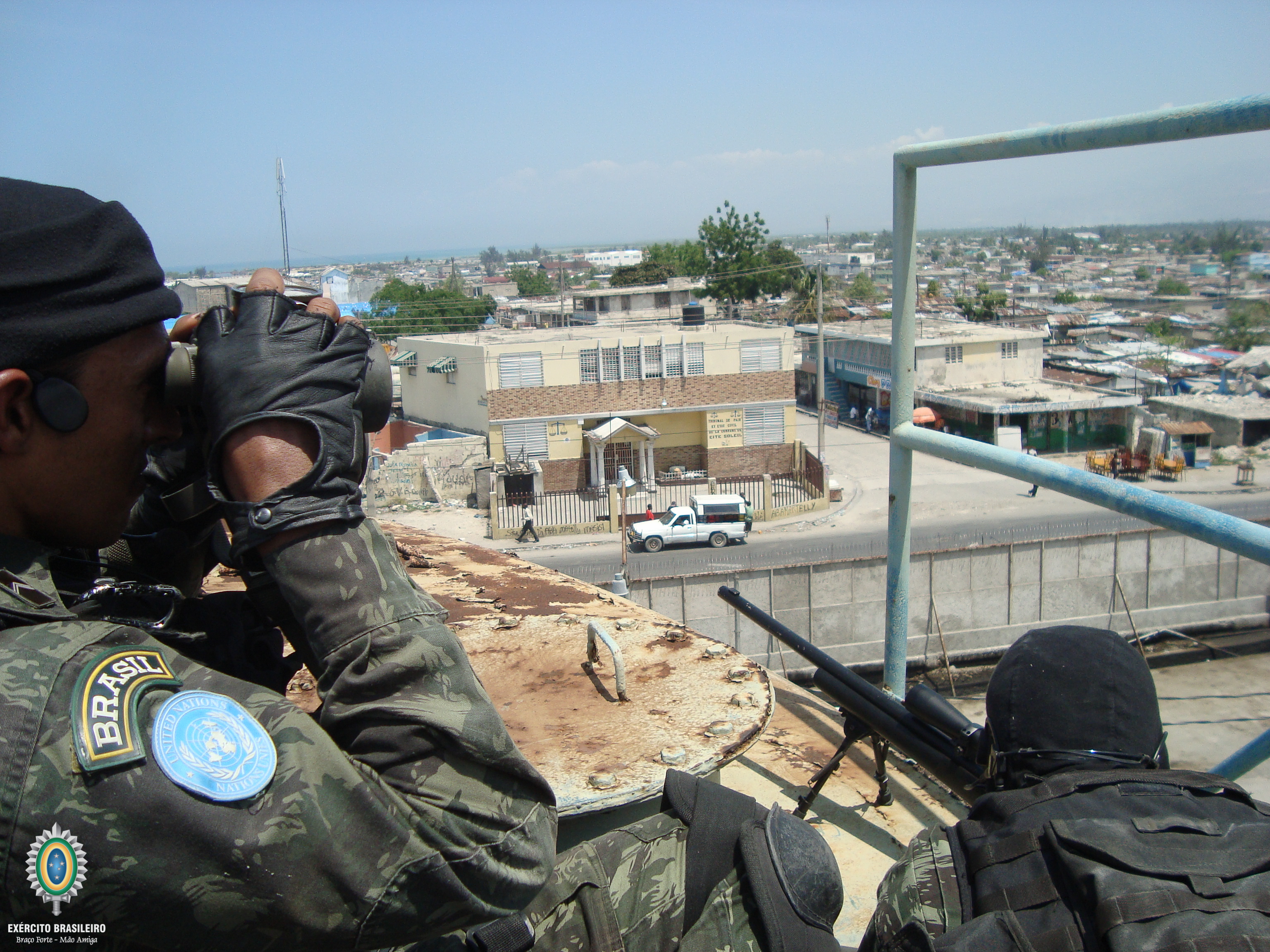
Brazilian Army snipers are positioned to defend UN base during combat with gangs in the Haitian capital Port-au-Prince in 2011.

On 29 February 2004, the Security Council passed a resolution "taking note of the resignation of Jean-Bertrand Aristide as President of Haiti and the swearing-in of President Boniface Alexandre as the acting President of Haiti in accordance with the Constitution of Haiti" and authorized the immediate deployment of a Multinational Interim Force.

On 30 April 2004, MINUSTAH was established as a Chapter VII peace enforcement mission and given its mandate with a military component of up to 6,700 troops.

In July, the General Assembly authorized the financing of the mission with US$200 million which followed a donors' conference in Washington DC.

The first progress report from MINUSTAH was released at the end of August.

In September the interim president of Haiti, Boniface Alexandre, spoke to the United Nations General Assembly in support of MINUSTAH.

In November there was a second report, and the Security Council mandate for MINUSTAH.

The mandate has most recently been extended by the Security Council until October 2010 "with the intention of further renewal".

== Status and history ==
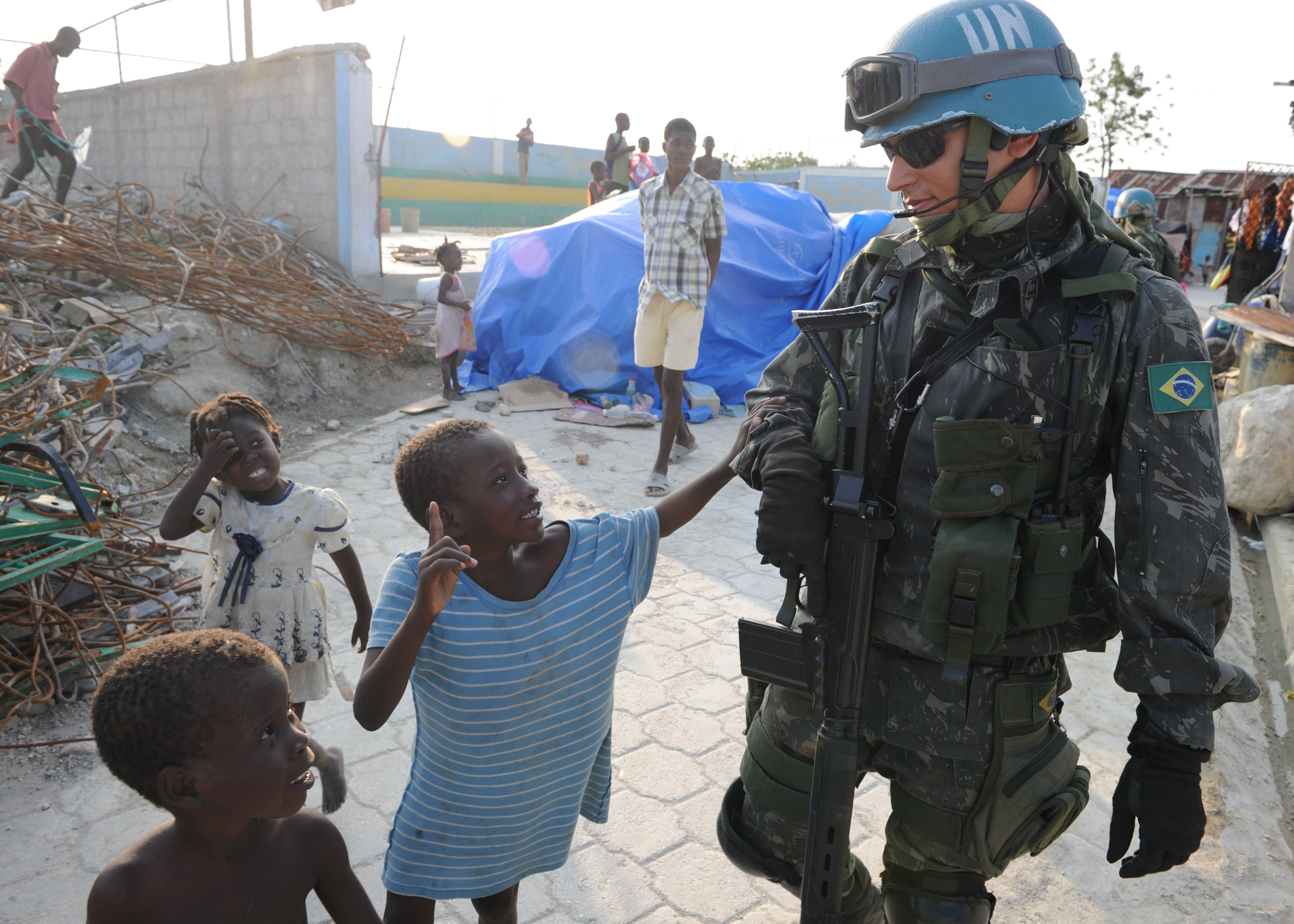
Brazilian Army U.N. peacekeeper.

UN headquarters, UNDP compound, UNICEF offices, in relation to the city of Port-au-Prince

Although the United Nations Stabilization Mission (MINUSTAH) had been in Haiti since 2004, as of 2007, it continued to struggle for control over the armed gangs. It maintained an armed checkpoint at the entrance to the shanty town of Cité Soleil and a roadblock with armed vehicles. In January 2006, two Jordanian peacekeepers were killed in Cité Soleil. In October 2006, a heavily armed group of the Haitian National Police were able to enter Cité Soleil for the first time in three years and were able to remain one hour as armoured UN troops patrolled the area. Since this is where the armed gangs take their kidnap victims, the police's ability to penetrate the area even for such a short time was seen as a sign of progress. The situation of continuing violence is similar in Port-au-Prince. Ex-soldiers, supporters of the ex-president, occupied the home of ex-president Jean-Bertrand Aristide against the wishes of the Haitian government. Before Christmas 2006, the UN force announced that it would take a tougher stance against gang members in Port-au-Prince. However, since then, the atmosphere there has not improved and the armed roadblocks and barbed wire barricades have not been moved. After four people were killed and another six injured in a UN operation exchange of fire with criminals in Cité Soleil in late January 2007, the United States announced that it would contribute $20 million to create jobs in Cité Soleil.

In early February 2007, 700 UN troops flooded Cité Soleil, which led to a major gun battle. Although the troops make regular forcible entries into the area, a spokesperson said this one was the largest attempted so far by the UN troops. On 28 July 2007, Edmond Mulet, the UN Special Representative in Haiti and MINUSTAH Mission Chief, warned of a sharp increase in lynchings and other mob attacks in Haiti. He said MINUSTAH, which now has 9,000 troops there, will launch a campaign to remind people that lynchings are a crime.

On 2 August 2007, UN Secretary-General Ban Ki-moon arrived in Haiti to assess the role of the UN forces, announcing that he would visit Cité Soleil during his visit. He said that it was Haiti's largest slum and, as such, was the most important target for U.N. peacekeepers in gaining control over the armed gangs. During his visit, he announced an extension of the mandate of the UN forces in Haiti. It took MINUSTAH three months and 800 arrests to deal with the gangs and decrease the number of kidnappings on the streets.

President René Préval has expressed ambivalent feelings about the UN security presence, stating that "if the Haitian people were asked if they wanted the UN forces to leave they would say yes." Survivors frequently blame the UN peacekeepers for deaths of relatives.

In April 2008, Haiti was facing a severe food crisis as well as governmental destabilization to Parliament's failure to ratify the president's choice of a prime minister. There were severe riots, so the UN force fired rubber bullets in Port-au-Prince and the riot calmed. The head of MINUSTAH called for a new government to be chosen as soon as possible. Meanwhile, the UN provided emergency food. Haiti was hit by four consecutive hurricanes between August and September 2008. These storms crippled coastal regions, requiring humanitarian aid for 800,000 people.

Critics of MINUSTAH's goal of providing security said that the provision of increased police presence came with the unfortunate consequence of neglecting the vast socioeconomic problems in the area, the lack of effort in addressing infrastructure improvement, the joblessness, and the pervasive poverty. In 2009, with the appointment of former U.S. President Bill Clinton as the UN Special Envoy, there was hope that the international donor community would provide increased aid. MINUSTAH renewed its commitment to Haiti, and $3 billion for projects was pledged by the international community, mainly for rebuilding after the hurricanes. However, in Cité Soleil, there were signs of a desire for political independence from the efforts of the international community.

In October 2010, nine months after the earthquake, the UN extended MINUSTAH's mission. In the capital, there were protests from those who want the MINUSTAH to leave. Demonstrators chanted "Down with the occupation" and burned the flag of Brazil, as representative of the largest contingent of MINUSTAH.

== 2010 earthquake ==
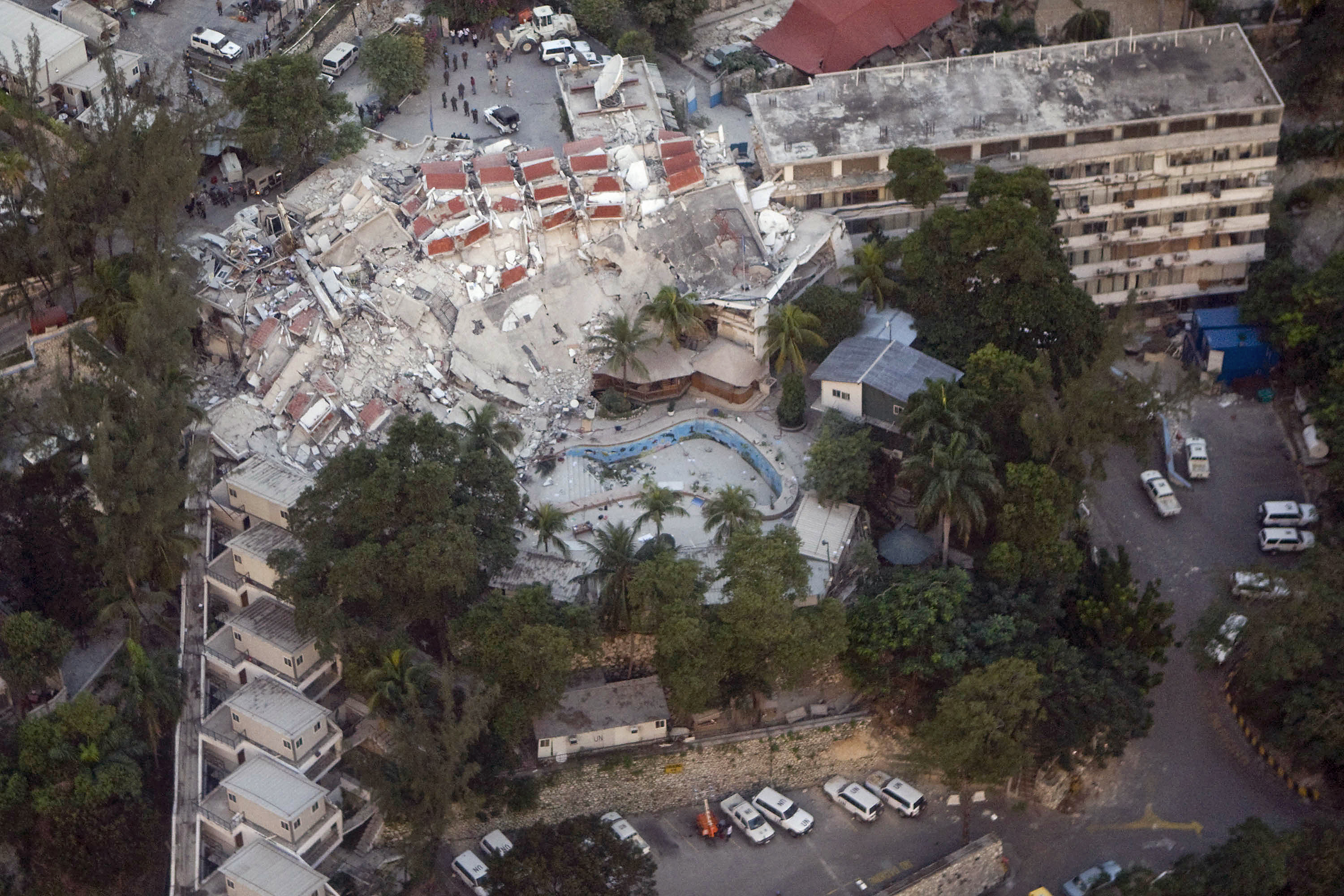
The collapsed headquarters after the 2010 earthquake.

On 12 January 2010, the United Nations reported that headquarters of the United Nations Stabilization Mission in Haiti (MINUSTAH), the Christopher Hotel in Port-au-Prince, collapsed, and several other UN facilities were damaged; a large number of UN personnel were unaccounted for in the aftermath of a major earthquake. The Mission's Chief, Hédi Annabi, was reported dead on 13 January by President René Préval and French news sources, and on 16 January, the United Nations confirmed the death after his body was recovered by a search and rescue team from China. Principal Deputy Special Representative Luiz Carlos da Costa was also confirmed dead, as well as the Acting Police Commissioner, Royal Canadian Mounted Police (RCMP) Superintendent Doug Coates, who were meeting with eight Chinese nationals—four peacekeepers and a delegation of four police officers from China—when the earthquake struck. The Chinese search and rescue team recovered the bodies of the ten individuals on 16 January 2010. Jens Kristensen, senior humanitarian officer for the UN, was rescued by a team from the state of Virginia after five days trapped in the rubble.

== Mission composition ==
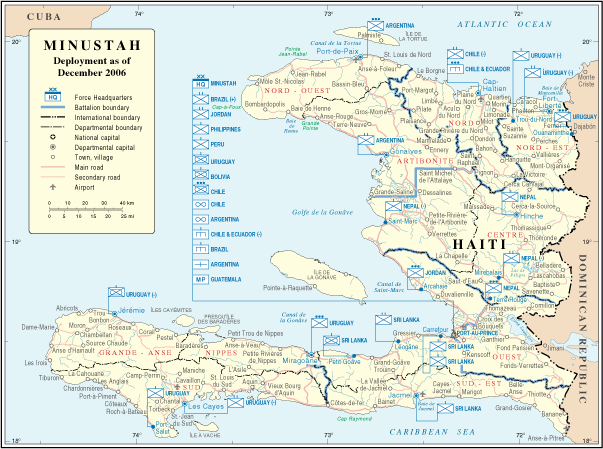
Map of MINUSTAH deployment in December 2006

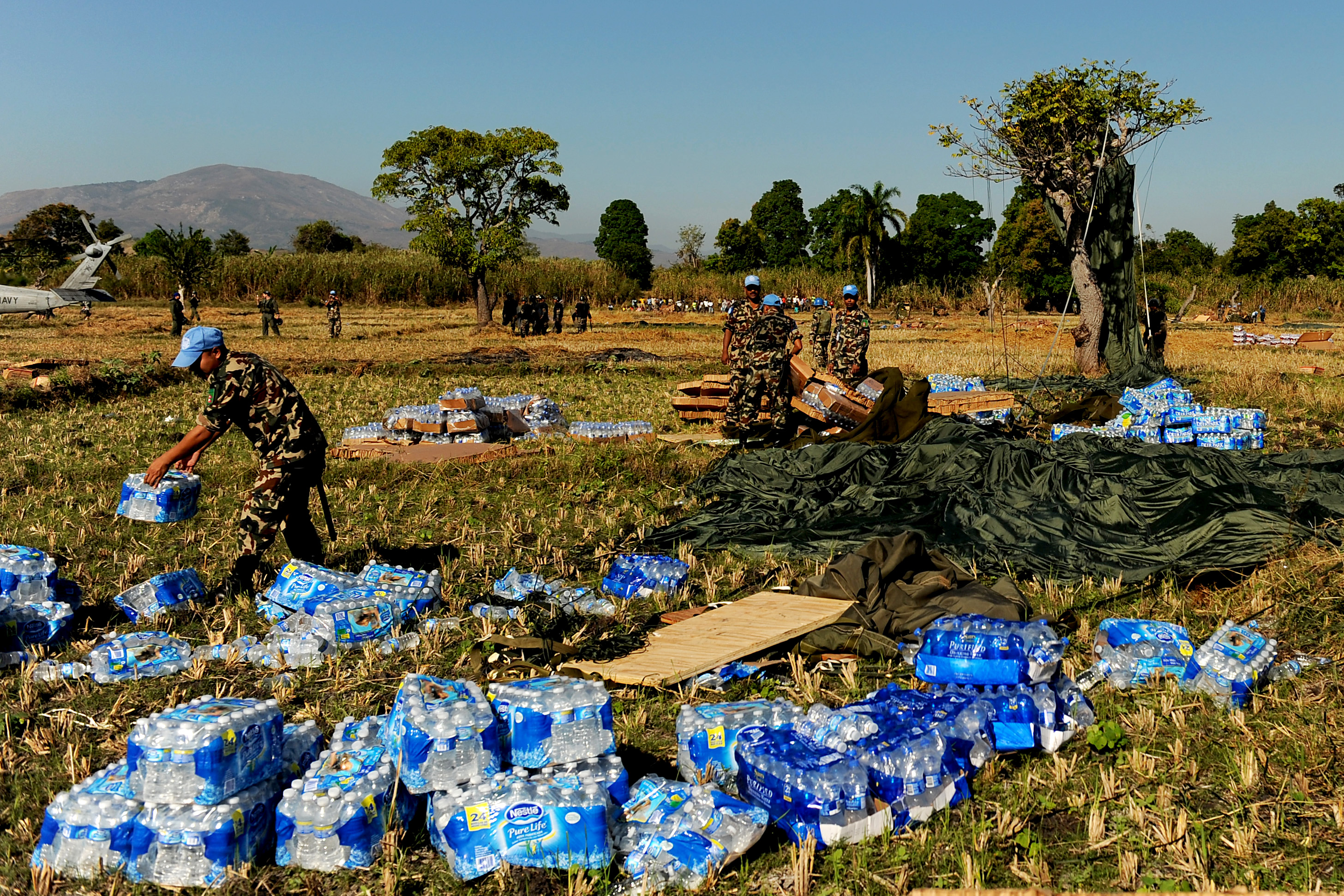
Nepalese members of MINUSTAH secure an airdrop of aid supplies in Mirebalais in January 2010

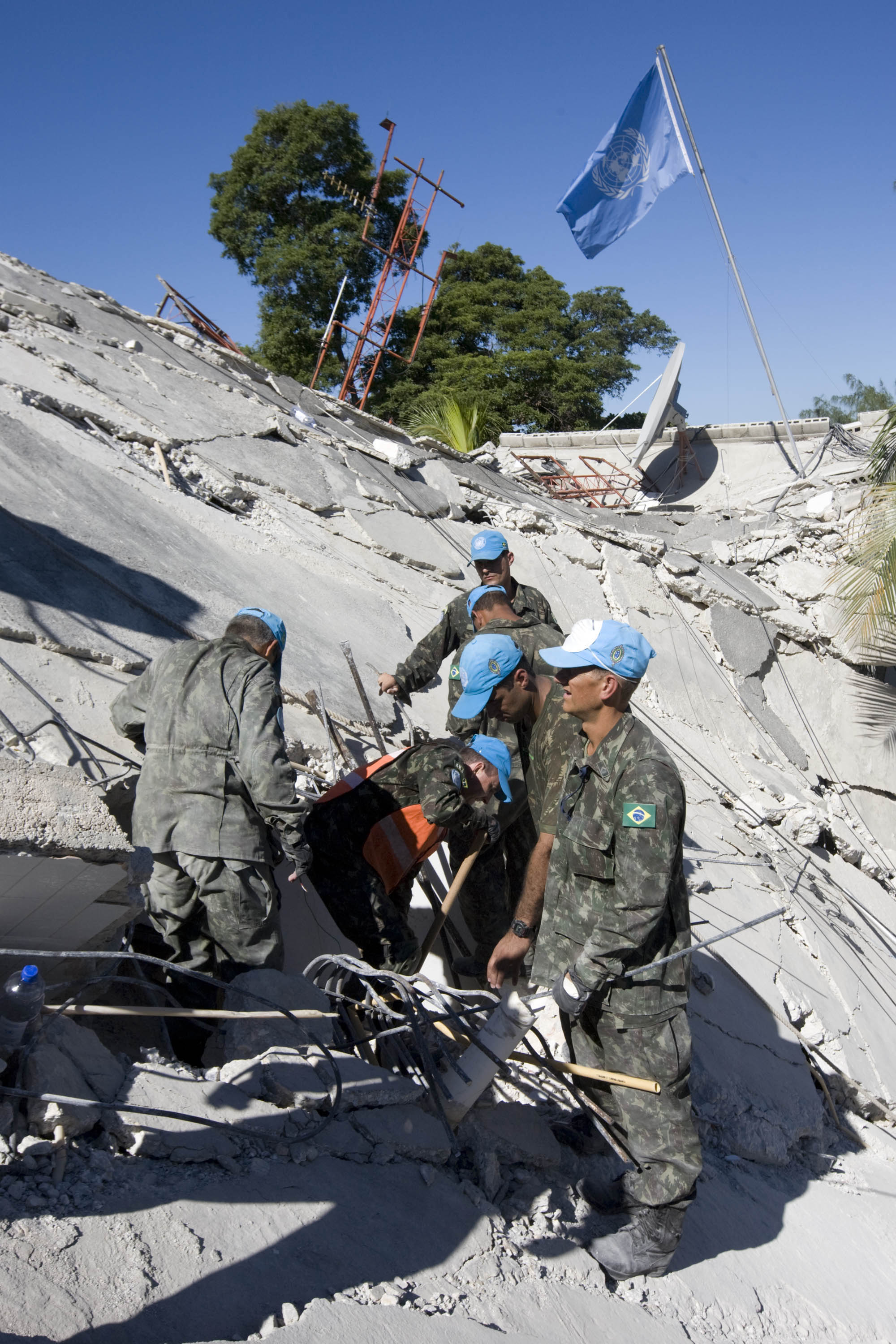
Brazilian military in helping the victims after the earthquake, 12 January 2010.

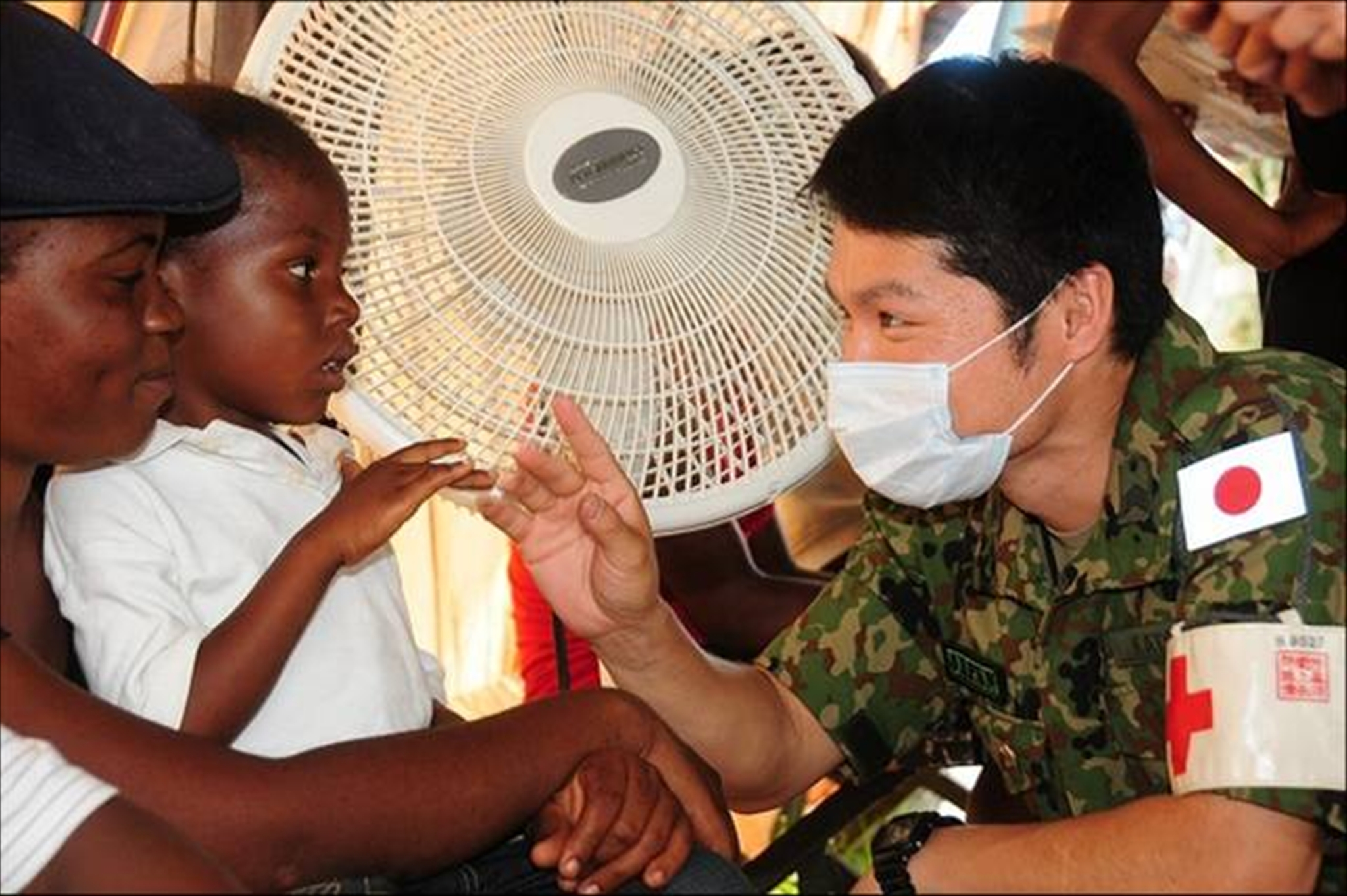
Medical examination by Japanese medical personnel

=== Heads of the United Nations Stabilization Mission in Haiti ===
- Juan Gabriel Valdés of Chile, August 2004 to May 2006.
- Edmond Mulet of Guatemala, June 2006 to August 2007.
- Hédi Annabi of Tunisia, September 2007 to January 2010.
- Edmond Mulet of Guatemala, January 2010 to June 2011.
- Mariano Fernández of Chile, June 2011 to January 2013.
- Nigel Fisher of Canada, January 2013 to July 2013 (interim appointment).
- Sandra Honoré of Trinidad and Tobago, July 2013 to October 2017.

=== Force commanders of the MINUSTAH military component ===
- Maj. General Augusto Heleno Ribeiro Pereira, Brazil, 2004 to August 2005
- Maj. General Urano Teixeira da Matta Bacellar, Brazil, September 2005 to January 2006.
- Maj. General Eduardo Aldunate Hermann, Chile, January 2006 (interim appointment).
- Lt. General José Elito Carvalho Siqueira, Brazil, January 2006 to January 2007.
- Maj. General Carlos Alberto dos Santos Cruz, Brazil, January 2007 to April, 2009.
- Maj. General Floriano Peixoto Vieira Neto, Brazil, April, 2009 to March 2010.
- Maj. General Luiz Guilherme Paul Cruz, Brazil, March, 2010 to March 2011
- Maj. General Luiz Eduardo Ramos Baptista Pereira, Brazil, March, 2011 to March 2012
- Maj. General Fernando Rodrigues Goulart, Brazil, March 2012 to March 2013
- Lt. General Edson Leal Pujol, Brazil, March 2013 to March 2014
- Lt. General Jose Luiz Jaborandy Junior, Brazil, March 2014 to August 2015
- Brig. General Jorge Peña Leiva, Chile, September to October 2015 (interim appointment)
- Lt. General Ajax Porto Pinheiro, Brazil, October 2015 to October 2017.

=== Countries contributing military personnel (7,208 in all) ===
Sources:

- Argentina (558 including a field hospital)
- Bolivia (208)
- Brazil (2,200)
- Bangladesh (2,200)
- Canada (10)
- Chile (499)
- Croatia (3)
- Dominican Republic (2)
- Ecuador (67)
- France (2)
- Guatemala (118)
- Indonesia (167)
- Japan (350)
- Jordan (728)
- Kyrgyzstan (25)
- Mexico (6)
- Nepal (1,075)
- Paraguay (31)
- Peru (209)
- Philippines (157)
- South Korea (242)
- Sri Lanka (959)
- United States (4)

=== Countries contributing police and/or civilian personnel (2,038 in all) ===
- Algeria (1)
- Benin (32)
- Brazil (4)
- Burkina Faso (26)
- Cameroon (8)
- Canada (94)
- Central African Republic (7)
- Chad (3)
- Chile (15)
- China (143)
- Colombia (37)
- Côte d'Ivoire (60)
- DR Congo (2)
- Egypt (22)
- El Salvador (7)
- France (64)
- Grenada (3)
- Guinea (55)
- India (139)
- Israel (14)
- Italy (4)
- Jamaica (5)
- Jordan (312)
- Madagascar (2)
- Mali (55)
- Nepal (168)
- Niger (62)
- Nigeria (128)
- Oman (2)
- Pakistan (248)
- Philippines (18)
- Romania (23)
- Russian Federation (10)
- Rwanda (14)
- Senegal (131)
- Serbia (5)
- South Africa (2)
- Spain (41)
- Sri Lanka (7)
- Togo (5)
- Thailand (20)
- Turkey (46)
- United States (48)
- Uruguay (7)
- Yemen (1)

== Cholera controversy ==
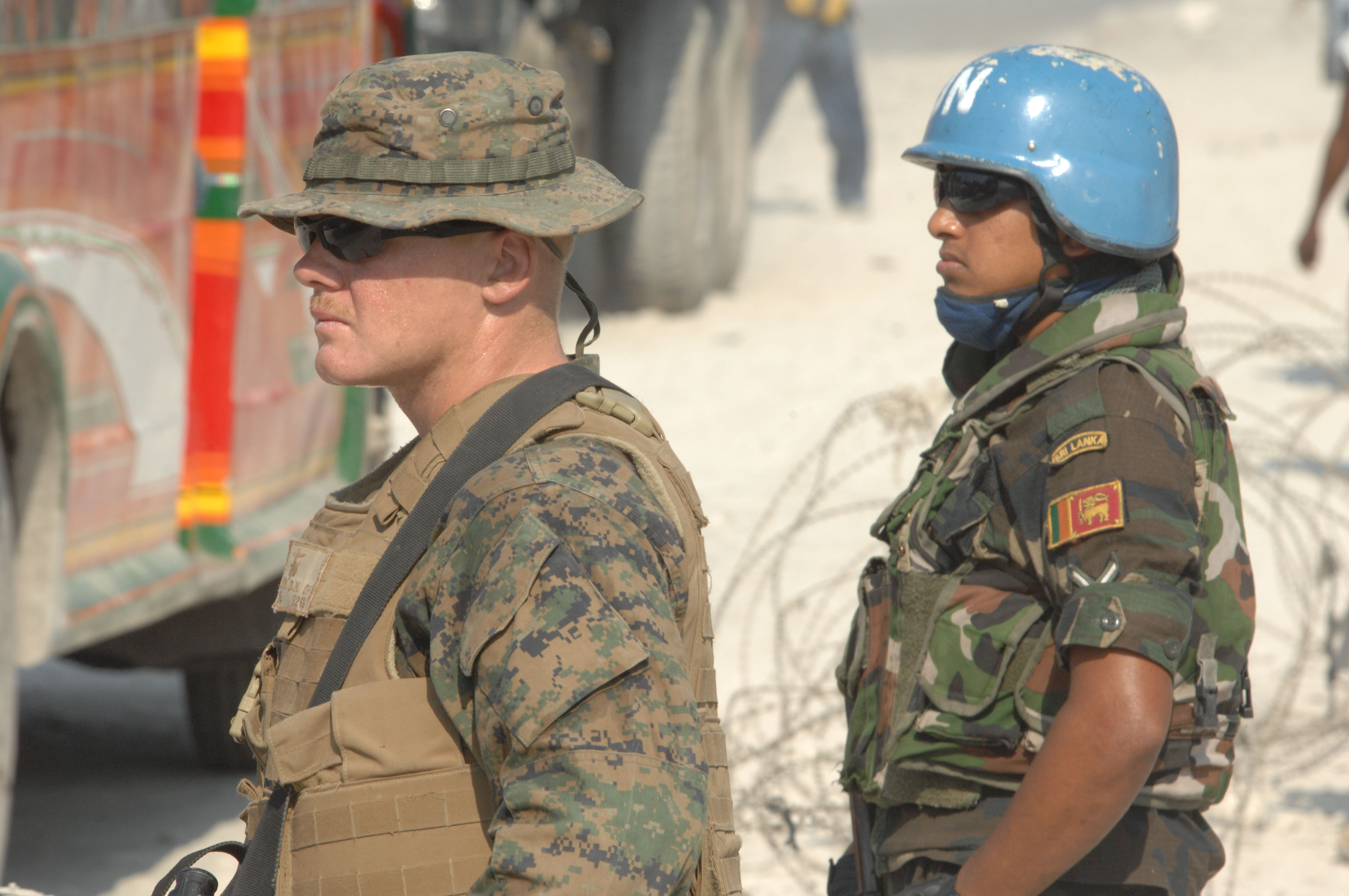
U.S. Marine Corps Cpl. Matt Kirkland and a United Nations peacekeeper from the Sri Lanka Army provide security for Haitian women receiving bags of rice for their families at a food distribution point in the city of Carrefour

In October 2010, a cholera outbreak was confirmed in Haiti—the first in the country's modern history. According to the Centers for Disease Control and Prevention (CDC), as of 4 August 2013, over 800,000 cases and 9,600 deaths had been reported since the outbreak first began in October 2010. MINUSTAH was linked with introducing the disease to the country by sources such as the CDC, the American Society for Microbiology, Yale Law School and the School of Public Health. The cause of the disease was attributed to faulty construction of UN sanitation systems in its base located in the town of Méyè. Many reports from Méyè stated that people had seen sewage spilling from the UN base into the Artibonite River, the largest river in Haiti, and which is used by residents for drinking, cooking, and bathing.

In December 2010, a study traced the Haitian cholera strain to South Asia. The UN conducted an independent investigation into the origin of the epidemic at the end of 2010. A panel of independent UN experts was assembled and their collective findings were compiled in a report. The panel determined that the evidence implicating the Nepalese troops was inconclusive. Though they admitted that the cholera strain was most likely from Nepal, it cited a confluence of factors that also contributed to the outbreak and that no one "deliberate action of, a group or individual was to blame". However, in 2013, the committee changed its statement concluding that the UN troops from Nepal "most likely" were the cause of the outbreak.

The Bureau des Avocats Internationaux (BAI), a Haitian coalition of lawyers, and the Institute for Justice & Democracy in Haiti (IJDH), its U.S. affiliate, filed claims with MINUSTAH on behalf of 5,000 Haitian petitioners in November 2011. The claims asked for the installation of the water and sanitation infrastructure necessary to control the epidemic, compensation for the victims, and an apology. Fifteen months later, in February 2013, the UN stated that the case was "not receivable," because it involved "review of policy matters", citing the Convention on Privileges and Immunities of the United Nations. In October 2013, BAI, IJDH, and another U.S. law firm filed a lawsuit challenging UN immunity in U.S. federal court on behalf of Haitian and Haitian-American victims of the cholera epidemic. In January 2015, Judge J. Paul Oetken of the U.S. District Court in Manhattan dismissed the lawsuit, affirming UN immunity. In May 2015, an appeal to Oetken's decision was filed.

In February 2013, the Haitian government created its National Plan for the Elimination of Cholera, a 10-year plan set to eradicate the disease. Two of the ten years will be devoted as a short-term response to the epidemic. The last eight will be to completely eliminate the disease. The projected budget for the plan is $2 billion. To support the initiative, UN Secretary-General Ban Ki-moon pledged $23.5 million to combat cholera. However, following the pledge, there was much discontent with the UN's progress. 19 members of the U.S. Congress urged the UN to take responsibility for cholera in Haiti. In two separate occasions, members of the US Congress sent a letter to the US ambassador to the UN, Susan Rice, urging her and the organization to ensure that the cholera initiative was fully funded and implemented quickly. Nineteen US Representatives also wrote to Ban Ki-Moon to express concerns about the seeming lack of progress in the UN's cholera response. Ban Ki-moon told members of the US Congress that the UN was committed in helping Haiti overcome the epidemic though no financial compensation to the victims would be granted. Since 2010, the UN has spent and/or committed more than $140 million to the epidemic.

On 9 May 2013, the Haitian Senate unanimously voted—save for one abstention—on a policy that would demand the UN to compensate the nation's cholera victims. The Senators also proposed to form "a commission of experts in international and penal law to study what legal means, both nationally and internationally, could be used to prove MINUSTAH's responsibility for starting the cholera outbreak."

=== Legacy ===
In August 2016, a report written by UN special rapporteur Philip Alston was leaked to the New York Times. Alston issued a scathing condemnation of the UN's legal approach to cholera in Haiti, which he termed "morally unconscionable, legally indefensible and politically self-defeating." Alston also lamented that the UN's approach "upholds a double standard according to which the U.N. insists that member states respect human rights, while rejecting any such responsibility for itself."

Four months later, Secretary-General Ban Ki-moon issued an apology for the UN's role in the cholera outbreak and stressed the organization's "moral responsibility" to fight the disease. Though the apology stopped short of admitting fault for introducing the disease to Haiti, many victim advocates saw it as a major milestone. Ban also launched "a new approach" to cholera by the UN, in the form of a two-track plan. The UN would raise $400 million in voluntary contributions from member states, with $200 million dedicated to providing material assistance to communities most affected by cholera, and another $200 million going to fight the disease. However, the plan gained little traction among member states. Because remaining funds allocated to MINUSTAH were not required to be repurposed for cholera reparations, many member states took back their contributions, and by July 2017 just $9.22 million had been raised.

== Criticism ==
From the beginning, MINUSTAH was squeezed between traditional conservative sectors —which demanded more action— and the leftist parties, mainly linked to ousted President Aristide, which criticized its actions and constantly appealed for its departure. A number of scandals implicated MINUSTAH peacekeepers in sexual exploitation and abuse of Haitians, including Haitian children.

=== Political overtones ===
Even though mostly composed by military forces—the recruitment of large numbers of foreign police officers has proven difficult—the United Nations Stabilization Mission in Haiti is a police mission of the United Nations dispatched to a country facing uncontained violence stemming from political unrest and from common criminals. Partidaries of former President Jean-Bertrand Aristide have characterized MINUSTAH as an attempt by the United States, Canada and France to neutralize the supporters of Fanmi Lavalas, Aristide's party. and secure the more pro-Western government of Gérard Latortue. The mission was mandated to assist and reinforce the action of the Haitian Police in Port-au-Prince's slums.

=== 6 July 2005 incident ===
On 6 July 2005, MINUSTAH, led by Brazilian general Augusto Heleno carried out a raid in the Cité Soleil section of Port-au-Prince. The raid targeted a base of illegally armed rebels led by the known bandit Dread Wilme. Reports from pro-Lavalas sources, as well as journalist Kevin Pina, contend that the raid targeted civilians and was an attempt to destroy the popular support for Haiti's exiled former leader, Aristide, before scheduled upcoming elections.

Estimates on the number of fatalities range from five to as high as 80, with the higher numbers being claimed by those reporting that the raid targeted civilians. All sources agree that no MINUSTAH personnel were killed. All sources also agree that Dread Wilme (born "Emmanuel Wilmer") was killed in the raid. MINUSTAH spokespeople called Wilme a "gangster." Other sources, such as the pro-Aristide Haitian Lawyers Leadership Network call Wilme a community leader and a martyr.

The incident has been since heralded by groups who oppose the MINUSTAH presence in Haiti and who support the return of ousted President Aristide. MINUSTAH has also been accused by Fanmi Lavalas supporters of allowing the Haitian National Police to commit atrocities and massacres against Lavalas supporters and Haitian citizens.

On 6 January 2006, UN mission head Juan Gabriel Valdés announced that MINUSTAH forces would undertake another action on Cité Soleil. On one side, traditional Haitian sectors criticized MINUSTAH for "standing by and not stopping the violence taking place in slums like Cité Soelil"; on the other hand, human rights groups were prepared to condemn MINUSTAH for any collateral damage deriving from their actions. It was reported that Valdés said, "We are going to intervene in the coming days. I think there'll be collateral damage but we have to impose our force, there is no other way."

=== Sexual abuse and exploitation of Haitians ===
MINUSTAH soldiers have been accused of being involved in a number of cases of sexual exploitation and abuse (SEA) of Haitians—including various sexual assault cases, and cases of child rape and child sexual exploitation.

==== Sri Lankan 2007 child sexual exploitation scandal ====
There were a number of accusations of exploitation of children by MINUSTAH troops, including accusations that some MINUSTAH troops from Sri Lanka had lured hungry children with food, into sexual service to the troops, who allegedly handed the children around among themselves. In November 2007, 114 members of the 950-member Sri Lanka peacekeeping contingent in Haiti were accused of sexual misconduct and abuse. 108 members, including 3 officers were sent back after being implicated in alleged misconduct and sexual abuse.

UN spokeswoman Michele Montas said: "The United Nations and the Sri Lankan government deeply regret any sexual exploitation and abuse that has occurred." The Sri Lankan Officials claim that there is little tangible evidence on this case. After inquiry into the case the UN Office of Internal Oversight Services (OIOS) has concluded 'acts of sexual exploitation and abuse (against children) were frequent and occurred usually at night, and at virtually every location where the contingent personnel were deployed.' The OIOS had assisted in the pending legal proceedings initiated by the Sri Lankan Government and has said charges should include statutory rape "because it involves children under 18 years of age".

Ultimately, several Sri Lankan personnel were disciplined, and some officers were "asked" to resign, for violations of military rules. However, the sexual activity in the cases was judged by Sri Lankan authorities to have been "consensual", and thus not criminal under Sri Lankan law. None of the Sri Lankans were imprisoned.

==== Uruguayan 2011 teen rape scandal ====
In 2011, four Uruguayan UN marines were accused of gang raping a 19-year-old Haitian male in Port-Salut. It was said the alleged rape was recorded with a cell phone by the peacekeepers themselves and leaked to the Internet. The teenager and his family were forced to relocate their house after the video went viral.

Ultimately, the victim went to Uruguay to testify against the accused, and four of the five accused were convicted of "private violence" (a lesser charge than rape or assault). The outcome was viewed as a rare victory, of sorts, for victims of U.N. peacekeepers, because the perpetrators are rarely convicted for their crimes.

==== Pakistani 2012 child rape scandal ====
In March 2012, three Pakistani MINUSTAH officers were found guilty of raping a mentally challenged 14-year-old boy in the town of Gonaïves. Pakistani officials sentenced each officer to one year in a Pakistan prison.

==== General investigation report 2015 ====
In 2015, a new U.N. investigation was released, accusing MINUSTAH peacekeepers of abusing further hundreds of Haitians, and citing MINUSTAH as one of the four U.N. peacekeeping operations, worldwide, with the highest rate of U.N. peacekeepers' sexual exploitation and abuse of local populations.

In interviews, UN investigators interviewed 231 Haitians who "admitted to having transactional sex with [MINUSTAH] peacekeepers," often in exchange for food, shelter, medicine and other basic necessities.

==== Haitian groups complaint to UN 2016 ====
In 2015, a coalition of Haitian human-rights and public-assistance organizations released a joint statement, complaining of the sexual abuse and exploitation of Haitians by MINUSTAH peacekeepers, civilian and military, and complaining of the inability of Haitians to counter those actions with prosecution or other forms of redress.

They specifically called for the United Nations and local officials to cooperate in investigating the crimes, and keep and make public records of the allegations and crimes. They also called for the cases to be referred to "local judicial system," and for paternity lawsuits against relevant U.N. personnel. For those accused MINUSTAH personnel investigated and/or prosecuted in their home country for crimes in Haiti, the coalition demanded that the U.N. provide ongoing information on the status of those cases. It finally called for a clarification of U.N. personnel responsibilities in these matters.

==== Child sexual exploitation criticism at shut down ====
In April 2017, immediately following the Security Council's unanimous vote to end MINUSTAH, U.S. Ambassador to the U.N., Nikki Haley—who had been arguing for a review of U.S.-funded U.N. peacekeeping missions, in a view to reduce spending—made a public issue of the allegations of child sexual abuse and exploitation by MINUSTAH peacekeepers, noting that the damage to the Haitian children would last beyond the peacekeepers withdrawal.

=== Human rights cases ===
In 2010, Gérard Jean-Gilles, a 16-year-old Haitian boy who ran miscellaneous errands for the Nepalese soldiers in Cap-Haitien, was found dead hanging inside of MINUSTAH's Formed Police Unit base. UN personnel denied responsibility, claiming that the teen committed suicide. The troops released the body for autopsy seventy-two hours after the death; the examination ruled out suicide as a potential cause of death. Nepalese UN troops were also accused for other misdeeds. Several days before the Jean-Gilles incident, the local press charged a Nepalese soldier of torturing a minor in a public area in Cap-Haitien. The soldier was said to have forced "his hands into the youth's mouth in an attempt to separate his lower jaw from his upper jaw, tearing the skin of his mouth."

People related to Fanmi Lavalas (Haiti's social-democratic party) have repeatedly expressed discontent with MINUSTAH and its management of political public dissent. Protests on 15 November 2010 in Cap-Haitien and other areas of the country resulted in at least two civilian deaths and numerous injuries. MINUSTAH stated that the protests seemed politically motivated, "aimed at creating a climate of insecurity on the eve of elections." Regarding the deaths, it stated that a UN peacekeeper shot out of self-defence.

Fanmi Lavalas took part in the burial of Catholic priest Gerard Jean-Juste on 18 June 2009. It was later reported that the procession was suddenly interrupted by gunfire. Fanmi Lavalas witnesses said that MINUSTAH Brazilian soldiers opened fire after attempting to arrest one of the mourners; the UN denied the shooting and reported that the victim had been killed by either a rock thrown by the crowd or a blunt instrument.

=== Legal proceedings ===
A trial is currently in progress at the Inter-American Court of Human Rights (IACHR). The case, brought forward by Mario Joseph from the Bureau des Avocats Internationaux (BAI) and Brian Concannon from the Institute for Justice & Democracy in Haiti, concerns Jimmy Charles, a grassroots activist who was arrested by UN troops in 2005, and handed over to the Haitian police. His body was found a few days later in the morgue, filled with bullet holes. The BAI filed a complaint in Haitian courts, to no avail, and in early 2006 it filed a petition with the IACHR. The IACHR accepted the case regarding the State of Haiti, and rejected the complaint against Brazil.

=== Ending ===
On 13 April 2017, the Security Council announced the replacement of this mission by a follow-up operation called the United Nations Mission for Justice Support in Haiti (MINUJUSTH) from 15 October 2017.

== Awards ==
Eighteen Rwanda National Police officers were decorated with service medals for their outstanding peacekeeping role in Haiti.

== See also ==
- United Nations Mission in Haiti
- List of UN peacekeeping missions
- List of countries where United Nations peacekeepers are currently deployed
