= Deaths in January 2006 =

The following is a list of notable deaths in January 2006.

Entries for each day are listed alphabetically by surname. A typical entry lists information in the following sequence:

- Name, age, country of citizenship at birth, subsequent country of citizenship (if applicable), reason for notability, cause of death (if known), and reference.

== January 2006 ==
=== 1 ===
- Frank T. Cary, 85, American businessman, chairman of IBM (1973–1981).
- Manon Charette, 50, Canadian Olympic handball player (1976).
- Marius Colau, 83, French footballer and Olympian (1948).
- Mapita Cortés, 66, Puerto Rican actress, cancer.
- Bryan Harvey, 49, American musician (House of Freaks), blunt-force trauma.
- Dawn Lake, 78, Australian entertainer.
- John Latham, 84, Zambian artist.
- Paul Lindblad, 64, American baseball player (Oakland Athletics), Alzheimer's disease.
- Dragan Lukić, 77, Serbian writer.
- Harry Magdoff, 92, American socialist and editor.
- Charles O. Porter, 86, American politician, representative from Oregon (1957–1961), Alzheimer's disease.
- Gideon Rodan, 71, American biochemist, cancer.
- Hubert Schoemaker, 55, Dutch chemist, co-founder of Centocor, brain cancer.
- Charles Steen, 86, American geologist and businessman.
- Angelo Vicardi, 69, Italian Olympic gymnast (1960, 1964).

=== 2 ===
- Frank Butler, 89, British sports journalist.
- Raúl Dávila, 74, Puerto Rican actor (All My Children) and television producer, heart attack.
- Christian Fischbacher, 90, Swiss Olympic skeleton racer (1948).
- Ofelia Fox, 82, Cuban nightclub owner (Tropicana Club), cancer.
- Sadao Kondoh, 80, Japanese baseball player.
- Henk de Looper, 93, Dutch Olympic field hockey player (1936).
- Osa Massen, 91, Danish actress.
- Klemens Mielczarek, 85, Polish actor.
- Cecilia Muñoz-Palma, 92, first female Philippine Supreme Court Justice.
- Dick Smith, 88, American diver and diving coach, pneumonia.
- Michael S. Smith, 59, American jazz drummer.
- Francis Steinmetz, 91, Dutch author and Colditz Castle escapee.
- Frank Wilkinson, 91, American civil liberties activist.
- John Wojtowicz, 60, American bank robber, cancer.
- John Woodnutt, 81, British actor.
- Lidia Wysocka, 89, Polish actress.

=== 3 ===
- Zoltan Farmati, 81, Romanian footballer and Olympian (1952).
- Urbano Lazzaro, 81, Italian resistance fighter, captured Benito Mussolini.
- Steve Rogers, 51, Australian rugby league player, apparent suicide.
- Sir William Skate, 52, Papua New Guinean politician, prime minister (1997–1999), stroke.
- Bruce Wilson, 64, Australian journalist, cancer.

=== 4 ===
- John Hahn-Petersen, 75, Danish actor, heart attack.
- Sophie Heathcote, 33, Australian actress (A Country Practice).
- Milton Himmelfarb, 87, American essayist.
- Stan Hunt, 76, American cartoonist.
- Irving Layton, 93, Canadian poet, complications from Alzheimer's disease.
- Sheikh Maktoum bin Rashid Al Maktoum, 62, Emirati emir, ruler of Dubai and prime minister (1971–1979, 1990–2006), heart attack.
- Gretl Schörg, 91, Austrian actress.
- Lourdes Van-Dúnem, 70, Angolan singer, typhoid fever.
- Nel van Vliet, 79, Dutch swimmer and Olympian (1948).

=== 5 ===
- Heinz Arendt, 88, German swimmer and Olympian (1936).
- Rod Dedeaux, 91, American college baseball coach, complications from a stroke.
- Börje Ekedahl, 77, Swedish Olympic bobsledder (1952).
- William H. G. FitzGerald, 96, American investor, philanthropist and diplomat, ambassador to Ireland, aortic aneurysm.
- Léon Gillaux, 86, Belgian footballer.
- Sven-Agne Larsson, 80, Swedish footballer and manager.
- Keizo Miura, 101, Japanese skier.
- Lord Merlyn-Rees, 85, Welsh-born politician, home secretary (1976–1979), following a number of falls.
- Ken Mosdell, 83, Canadian ice hockey player (Montreal Canadiens, Chicago Blackhawks).
- Mark Roberts, 84, American actor (Gilda, Dan August, Black Arrow).
- Simon Shanks, 34, American football player (Arizona Cardinals), shot.
- Rachel Squire, 51, British MP (1992–2006), stroke.
- Alex St. Clair, 64, American musician (Captain Beefheart).
- Vajramuni, 62, Indian actor.

=== 6 ===
- J. W. Brodnax, 69, American football player (LSU Tigers, Denver Broncos).
- Allaire du Pont, 92, American Thoroughbred racehorse owner (Kelso).
- Roshan Khan, 76, Pakistani squash player, complications from a heart attack and coma.
- Józef Milik, 83, Polish Catholic priest and Dead Sea Scrolls scholar.
- Comandanta Ramona, 47, Mexican Tzotzil Zapatista rebel leader and women's rights advocate, kidney disease and tuberculosis.
- Lou Rawls, 72, American jazz and blues singer, lung and brain cancer.
- Hugh Thompson Jr., 62, American Army officer, helped stop the My Lai Massacre, removed from life support.
- Stanley R. Tupper, 84, American politician, representative from Maine from (1961–1967).
- Gábor Zavadszky, 31, Hungarian footballer, pulmonary embolism.

=== 7 ===
- Urano Teixeira da Matta Bacellar, 58, Brazilian soldier, head of MINUSTAH (since 2005), suicide by gunshot.
- Heinrich Harrer, 93, Austrian mountaineer, geographer and author.
- Vic Marino, 87, American football player (Ohio State Buckeyes, Baltimore Colts).
- Alf McMichael, 78, Northern Irish footballer.
- Gábor Zavadszky, 31, Hungarian footballer and Olympian (1996).
- Jim Zulevic, 40, American actor (The Specials), heart attack.

=== 8 ===
- Tony Banks, Baron Stratford, 62, British politician and peer, minister for sport (1997–1999), stroke and cerebral hemorrhage.
- Elson Becerra, 27, Colombian footballer, shot.
- Merv Connors, 91, American baseball player (Chicago White Sox).
- Alex Elmsley, 76, English magician, heart attack.
- Georg Wilhelm, Prince of Hanover, 90, German aristocrat, educator and Olympian.
- James Robert Hightower, 90, American Sinologist.
- Veijo-Lassi Holopainen, 84, Finnish Olympic field hockey player (1952).
- Butch McDonald, 89, Canadian ice hockey player (Detroit Red Wings, Chicago Black Hawks).
- Katherine Peden, 80, American politician.
- David Rosenbaum, 63, American journalist (The New York Times), head injury during mugging.
- Gloria Root, 57, American model and businesswoman, cancer.
- Mimmo Rotella, 87, Italian artist.
- Raatbek Sanatbayev, 36, Kyrgyz Olympic Greco-Roman wrestler (1996, 2000), shot.
- Garrafa Sánchez, 31, Argentine footballer, injuries sustained in a traffic collision.
- Jim Spruill, 82, American basketball and football player (Baltimore Colts, Indianapolis Jets).
- Sidney Williams, 91, American baseball player.

=== 9 ===
- Richard Aquilina, 52, Maltese footballer.
- Andy Caldecott, 41, Australian Dakar Rally motorcycle rider, fatal neck injury sustained in an accident in Mauritania.
- Patricia Hitt, 87, American Assistant Secretary of Health, Education, and Welfare under President Nixon, natural causes.
- Selwyn Hughes, 77, British fundamentalist evangelical who founded Crusade for World Revival.
- Ahmad Kazemi, 47, Iranian brigadier general, commander of the IRGC Ground Forces (since 2005), plane crash.
- Mikk Mikiver, 68, Estonian stage director and actor.
- W. Cleon Skousen, 92, American conservative author, BYU professor and prominent Latter-day Saint author and lecturer.
- Gordon Smith, 55, Canadian inventor.
- Jack Snow, 62, American football player (Los Angeles Rams) and radio announcer, complications from a staph infection.
- Donald Bruce Stewart, 70, American actor (Guiding Light, American Ninja, Rover Dangerfield), lung cancer.

=== 10 ===
- Ira Black, 64, American neuroscientist, founder of the Stem Cell Institute of New Jersey, infection related to a tumor.
- Dave Brown, 52, American NFL player (Pittsburgh Steelers, Seattle Seahawks, Green Bay Packers), heart attack.
- Elliot Forbes, 88, American conductor, musicologist, Harvard University professor and Beethoven scholar.
- Sidney Frank, 86, American businessman and philanthropist, heart failure.
- Alethea Hayter, 94, British writer.
- Dennis Marks, 73, American animation writer-producer.
- John Sinibaldi, 92, American Olympic cyclist (1932, 1936).
- Jack Edward Tanner, 86, American district judge.

=== 11 ===
- Bernard Dafney, 37, American football player, heart attack.
- Eric Namesnik, 35, American Olympic swimmer (1992, 1996), injuries from a car crash.
- Mark Spoon, 39, German DJ, prominent figure in trance music and member of (Jam & Spoon), heart attack.
- Mabel Sine Wadsworth, 95, American birth control activist and women's health educator.

=== 12 ===
- William Matthew Byrne Jr., 75, American federal judge, presiding judge in the trial of Daniel Ellsberg, pulmonary fibrosis.
- Brendan Cauldwell, 83, Irish actor, died in sleep.
- Eldon Dedini, 84, American cartoonist, esophageal cancer.
- Faisal bin Hamad Al Khalifa, 14, Bahraini prince, injuries from a car crash.
- Günther Landgraf, 77, German physicist and former president of Technische Universität Dresden.
- Stu Linder, 74, American film editor (Grand Prix, Rain Man, Good Morning, Vietnam), Oscar winner (1967).
- Nicolas May, 78, Luxembourgian Olympic footballer (1948).
- Anne Meacham, 80, American actress (Suddenly, Last Summer, Another World, Lilith).
- Meinrad Schütter, 95, Swiss composer.

=== 13 ===
- Raúl Anguiano, 90, Mexican engraver and painter.
- Gordon Atkinson, 83, Canadian broadcaster and politician.
- Richard Dalitz, 80, Australian physicist, expert in exotic particles, studied quarks.
- Frank Fixaris, 71, American sportscaster, house fire.
- Ron Jessie, 57, American football player (Los Angeles Rams, Detroit Lions, Buffalo Bills), heart attack.
- Marc Potvin, 38, Canadian hockey player (Detroit Red Wings, Los Angeles Kings, Hartford Whalers), suicide by hanging.
- Joan Root, 69, American wildlife conservationist, shot.

=== 14 ===
- William Matthew Byrne Jr., 75, American district judge (United States District Court for the Central District of California).
- Henri Colpi, 84, Swiss film director and cinematographer.
- Bertil Eng, 75, Swedish Olympic speed skater (1956).
- Jim Gary, 66, American sculptor, complications from a cerebral hemorrhage.
- Lisa Gelius, 96, German athlete.
- Conrad Hendricks, 27, South African professional football player, car crash.
- Bubba Morton, 74, American baseball player (Detroit Tigers, Milwaukee Braves, California Angels), and coach.
- Mark Philo, 21, English professional football player, injuries from a car crash.
- Álvaro Vicente, 77, Spanish Olympic boxer (1948).
- Bob Weinstock, 77, American record producer, founded independent jazz record label Prestige Records, complications of diabetes.
- Shelley Winters, 85, American actress (The Diary of Anne Frank, Lolita, The Poseidon Adventure), Oscar winner (1960, 1966), heart failure.

=== 15 ===
- Jaber Al-Ahmad Al-Sabah, 79, Kuwaiti Emir, brain hemorrhage.
- Glyn Berry, 59, Welsh-born Canadian diplomat in Afghanistan.
- Hilma Contreras, 92, Dominican writer.
- Edward N. Hall, 91, U.S. Air Force rocket expert, father of the Minuteman intercontinental ballistic missile program.
- Gregory Kimble, 88, American psychologist.
- William Post, 66, American lottery winner.
- Mogens Sørensen, 75, Danish Olympic rower (1956).
- George Worth, 90, American Olympic fencer (1948, 1952, 1956, 1960).

=== 16 ===
- Stanley Biber, 82, American physician and pioneer in sex reassignment surgery, complications of pneumonia.
- Werner Biel, 78, German Olympic rower (1952).
- Rebiha Khebtani, 79, French Algerian politician, MP.
- Jan Mark, 62, British children's writer, meningitis.
- Richard P. McCormick, 89, American historian, professor at Rutgers University.
- Gene Pepper, 78, American football player (Missouri Tigers, Washington Redskins, Baltimore Colts).
- Jack Russell, 86, American football player (Baylor Bears, New York Yankees, New York Yanks).
- Willie Smith, 66, American baseball player (Los Angeles/California Angels, Chicago Cubs, Cleveland Indians), heart attack.

=== 17 ===
- Clarence Ray Allen, 76, American convicted murderer, executed by lethal injection.
- Harold R. Collier, 90, American politician, former Republican United States Representative from Illinois from 1957 to 1975.
- Wallace Mercer, 59, British businessman, former chairman of Heart of Midlothian F.C., cancer.
- Seth Morehead, 71, American baseball player (Philadelphia Phillies, Chicago Cubs, Milwaukee Braves).
- Bob Repass, 88, American baseball player (St. Louis Cardinals, Washington Senators).
- Giles Worsley, 44, British architectural historian and journalist, nephew of the Katharine, Duchess of Kent, cancer.

=== 18 ===
- Leonardo Ribeiro de Almeida, 81, Portuguese politician.
- Norman McCabe, 94, American animator (Looney Tunes, G.I. Joe: A Real American Hero, My Little Pony).
- Theodore McMillian, 86, American Circuit judge (United States Court of Appeals for the Eighth Circuit).
- Thomas Murphy, 90, American former CEO of General Motors.
- Anton Rupert, 89, South African businessman, philanthropist and founding member of World Wide Fund for Nature, natural causes.
- Stjepan Steiner, 90, Croatian physician, doctor to Josip Broz Tito.
- Jan Twardowski, 90, Polish priest and poet.

=== 19 ===
- Gábor Agárdy, 83, Hungarian actor (The Round-Up, Mattie the Goose-boy).
- Gary Downie, 65, South African psychotherapist and television production manager (Doctor Who, Star Cops), cancer.
- Anthony Franciosa, 77, American actor (A Hatful of Rain, Career, City Hall), stroke.
- Tom Nugent, 92, American football coach, member of the College Football Hall of Fame, congestive heart failure.
- Wilson Pickett, 64, American soul singer, heart attack.
- Awn Alsharif Qasim, 73, Sudanese writer, educator and Islamic scholar.
- Geoff Rabone, 84, New Zealand cricketer.
- Mladen Romić, 43, Croatian footballer.
- Hans Schenk, 70, German Olympic javelin thrower (1964).
- Franz Seitz Jr., 84, German film director.
- Pio Taofinuʻu, 82, Samoan Roman Catholic cardinal.
- Ray Wertis, 82, American basketball player (Toronto Huskies, Cleveland Rebels, Providence Steamrollers).

=== 20 ===
- Blake Ball, 67, Canadian ice hockey player (Cleveland Crusaders).
- John D. Butzner Jr., 88, American federal judge.
- Elmer Otto Friday, 81, American politician.
- Andrei Iordan, 71, Kyrgyz politician, former prime minister of Kyrgyzstan.
- David Edward Maust, 51, American convicted serial killer, heart failure after a botched suicide attempt.
- Dave Lepard, 25, Swedish musician (Crashdïet), suicide.
- Rose Nader, 99, Lebanese-born president of the Shafeek Nader Trust for the Community Interest, heart failure.
- Leslie Wilson, 80, British Olympic cyclist (1952).

=== 21 ===
- Michael Chan, Baron Chan, 65, British paediatrician, second peer of Chinese origin.
- Larry Comley, 66, American basketball player (Kansas State Wildcats, Baltimore Bullets).
- John James Cowperthwaite, 90, British civil servant, Financial Secretary of Hong Kong (1961–1971).
- Robert Knudson, 80, American sound engineer (Cabaret, The Exorcist, E.T. the Extra-Terrestrial), Oscar winner (1973, 1974, 1983), supranuclear palsy.
- Ibrahim Rugova, 61, Kosovan politician, President of Kosovo, lung cancer.

=== 22 ===
- Janette Carter, 82, American last living member of the Carter Family country music group.
- Alec Coxon, 90, English cricketer, Yorkshire and England player.
- Sherman Ferguson, 61, American jazz drummer.
- Aydın Güven Gürkan, 65, Turkish academic and politician (chairman of SHP).
- Albert Irwin, 88, Canadian Olympic alpine skier (1948).
- Nellie Y. McKay, 67, African-American literary critic, colon cancer.
- Mantokoane Pitso, 30, Lesotho Olympic middle-distance runner (1992).

=== 23 ===
- Ernie Baron, 65, Filipino radio/TV host and meteorologist, heart attack brought about by diabetes.
- Andrea Bronfman, 60, American philanthropist and wife of Charles Bronfman, hit by car.
- Savino Guglielmetti, 94, Italian gymnast, and oldest surviving Olympic champion (1932, 1936, 1948).
- Samuel W. Koster, 86, United States Army officer, highest ranking United States Army officer charged in My Lai massacre, renal cancer.
- Chris McKinstry, 38, Canadian independent researcher in artificial intelligence, suicide by inert gas asphyxiation.
- Joseph M. Newman, 96, American film director (This Island Earth, Tarzan, the Ape Man, King of the Roaring '20s: The Story of Arnold Rothstein).
- Dion Ørnvold, 84, Danish footballer and Olympian (1948).
- Bill Rice, 74, American artist and actor (Coffee and Cigarettes).
- Virginia Smith, 94, American politician, former Republican United States Representative from Nebraska (1975–1991).
- Michael Wharton, 92, British humorist.

=== 24 ===
- Zaki Badawi, 84, Egyptian Islamic scholar, Islamic religious leader in Britain.
- Schafik Handal, 75, Salvadoran politician, former presidential candidate and leader of El Salvador's main political opposition party, the FMLN, heart attack.
- Kiki Heck, 81, Dutch Olympic diver (1948).
- Peter Ladefoged, 80, American phonetician, stroke.
- Carlos Martínez, 40, Venezuelan baseball player (Chicago White Sox, Cleveland Indians, California Angels).
- Fayard Nicholas, 91, American dancer, elder of the renowned Nicholas Brothers, pneumonia and complications of a stroke.
- Chris Penn, 40, American actor (Footloose, Reservoir Dogs, The Funeral), heart disease.
- Sir Nicholas Shackleton, 68, British geologist, leukaemia.

=== 25 ===
- Robin Coombs, 84, British immunologist, developed Coombs Antibody test
- Marion Dudley, 33, American convicted murderer, executed in Texas.
- Luther Green, 59, American NBA player (New York Nets, Philadelphia 76ers), lung cancer.
- John F. Kerin, Australian professor, reproductive scientist and gynaecologist, farm accident.
- Susan Bieke Neilson, 49, American circuit judge (United States Court of Appeals for the Sixth Circuit).
- Herbert Schilder, 77, American dental surgeon, improved root canal procedures, Lewy body disease.
- Sudharmono, 78, Indonesian politician and lieutenant general, vice president of Indonesia from 1988 to 1993, pneumonia.
- Allan Temko, 81, American architectural critic and writer, Pulitzer Prize-winning architecture critic for the San Francisco Chronicle, brief illness.

=== 26 ===
- Len Carlson, 68, Canadian voice actor (The Raccoons, Rolie Polie Olie, Atomic Betty), heart attack.
- John Dunwoody, 76, British Member of Parliament, effects of an accident.
- Morris Silverman, 93, American philanthropist, founder of the Albany Medical Center Prize in Medicine and Biomedical Research.
- Dave Tatsuno, 92, Japanese American businessman, documented the Topaz Japanese internment camp in his film Topaz.
- Yolande Teillet, 78, Canadian baseball player.
- Abdul Wali Khan, 89, Pakistani politician, prominent opposition Leader and prominent Pashtun leader, heart attack.

=== 27 ===
- Maurice Colclough, 52, English Rugby Union player, brain tumour.
- Tana Hoban, 88, American photographer of children, author of over 110 children's books.
- Phyllis King, 100, British Wimbledon winner.
- Carol Lambrino, 86, Romanian Prince, elder son of King Carol II of Romania.
- Christopher Lloyd, 84, British gardening writer, stroke.
- Gene McFadden, 56, American singer and songwriter, cancer.
- Victor Mishcon, Baron Mishcon, 90, British solicitor and politician.
- Johannes Rau, 75, German politician, President of Germany (Bundespräsident) from 1999 to 2004.
- Leslie Williams, 83, Welsh rugby player.

=== 28 ===
- Frank Campos, 81, Cuban baseball player (Washington Senators).
- Stan Galle, 86, American baseball player (Washington Senators).
- Peter Isola, 76, Gibraltarian politician, Deputy Chief Minister of Gibraltar (1956–1984).
- Yitzchak Kaduri, 106, Iraqi-born renowned Sephardic Orthodox rabbi and kabbalist.
- Henry McGee, 76, British actor.
- Carl Rutherford, 76, American singer and songwriter.
- Sauli Rytky, 87, Finnish cross-country skier and Olympic medalist (1948).

=== 29 ===
- Andrew Gonzalez, 65, Filipino linguist and educator, complications from diabetes.
- Lau Mulder, 78, Dutch field hockey player and Olympic medalist (1952).
- Nam June Paik, 73, South Korean-born American artist, particularly noted for his video art, natural causes.
- George Psychoundakis, 85, Greek Resistance fighter during World War II.

=== 30 ===
- Stew Albert, 66, American 1960s anti-establishment activist, co-founder of the Yippies, liver cancer.
- Glenn Canfield Jr., 70, American metallurgist and businessman.
- Guilherme Cavalcanti, 84, Brazilian Olympic sports shooter (1952).
- Paul Clinton, 53, American CNN film critic, founder of the Broadcast Film Critics Association (BFCA).
- Seth Fisher, 33, American comic book artist (Green Lantern: Willworld, Batman: Legends of the Dark Knight), fall.
- Arnold Graffi, 95, German Researcher for oncology, long illness.
- Coretta Scott King, 78, American civil rights leader, widow of Martin Luther King Jr., ovarian cancer.
- Otto Lang, 98, Bosnian-born American film producer and ski mogul, heart disease.
- Irving Rosenwater, 73, English statistician and author.
- Wendy Wasserstein, 55, American playwright, lymphoma.

=== 31 ===
- Owen Abrahams, 72, Australian rules footballer, serious illness.
- Ruairí Brugha, 88, Irish Fianna Fáil politician.
- Henry S. Coleman, 79, American educational administrator, dean at Columbia University.
- Bernhard Johansen, 76, Norwegian footballer.
- Ede Komáromi, 77, Hungarian basketball player and Olympian (1952).
- Boris Kostelanetz, 94, Russian-born American tax lawyer.
- George Koval, 92, Soviet intelligence agent.
- Paul Regina, 49, American actor (Brothers, Joe & Valerie, L.A. Law), liver cancer.
- Jason Sears, 38, American punk rock singer (Rich Kids on LSD), complications from drug abuse.
- Moira Shearer, 80, British ballerina, actress, and newspaper columnist, married to Sir Ludovic Kennedy, natural causes.
