= Hitt =

Hitt or HITT can refer to:

== People ==
=== Politicians ===
- Arthur A. Hitt, American politician
- Edmund Hitt, American politician
- Henry D. Hitt, American politician
- Patricia Hitt, American politician
- Robert R. Hitt, American politician

=== Writers ===
- Brandi Hitt, American journalist
- David Hitt, American author
- Jack Hitt, American author

=== Educators ===
- Homer Hitt, dean of the University of New Orleans
- John Hitt, president of the University of Central Florida

=== Athletes ===
- Bruce Hitt, baseball player
- Roy Hitt, baseball player

=== Others ===
- Agnes Hitt (1845-1919), national president of the Woman's Relief Corps
- Bryan Hitt, drummer of American rock band REO Speedwagon

== Places ==
In the United States

- Hitt, LaSalle County, Illinois
- Hitt, Missouri
- Hitt's Mill and Houses, a historic site in Maryland
- Samuel M. Hitt House, a historic site in Illinois

== Other uses ==
- Heparin-induced thrombocytopenia and thrombosis, a type of disease
- Hittite Microwave Corporation, NASDAQ stock symbol
- HITT Production, a Turkish record label

== See also ==
- HIIT
