= Maryland Route 845 =

State highway in Maryland, United States

Maryland Route 845

Route information
- Maintained by MDSHA
- Length: 1.23 mi (1.98 km)
- Existed: 1961–present

Major junctions
- South end: MD 34 south of Keedysville
- North end: MD 34 north of Keedysville

Location
- Country: United States
- State: Maryland
- Counties: Washington

Highway system
- Maryland highway system; Interstate; US; State; Scenic Byways
← MD 844	→ MD 846

Maryland Route 845 (MD 845) is an unsigned state highway in the U.S. state of Maryland. Known for most of its length as Main Street, the state highway runs 1.23 miles (1.98 km) between intersections with MD 34 on either side of Keedysville in southern Washington County. MD 845, which is officially MD 845A, is the old alignment of MD 34 through Keedysville. The state highway was designated around 1960 when MD 34 bypassed the town.

== Route description ==
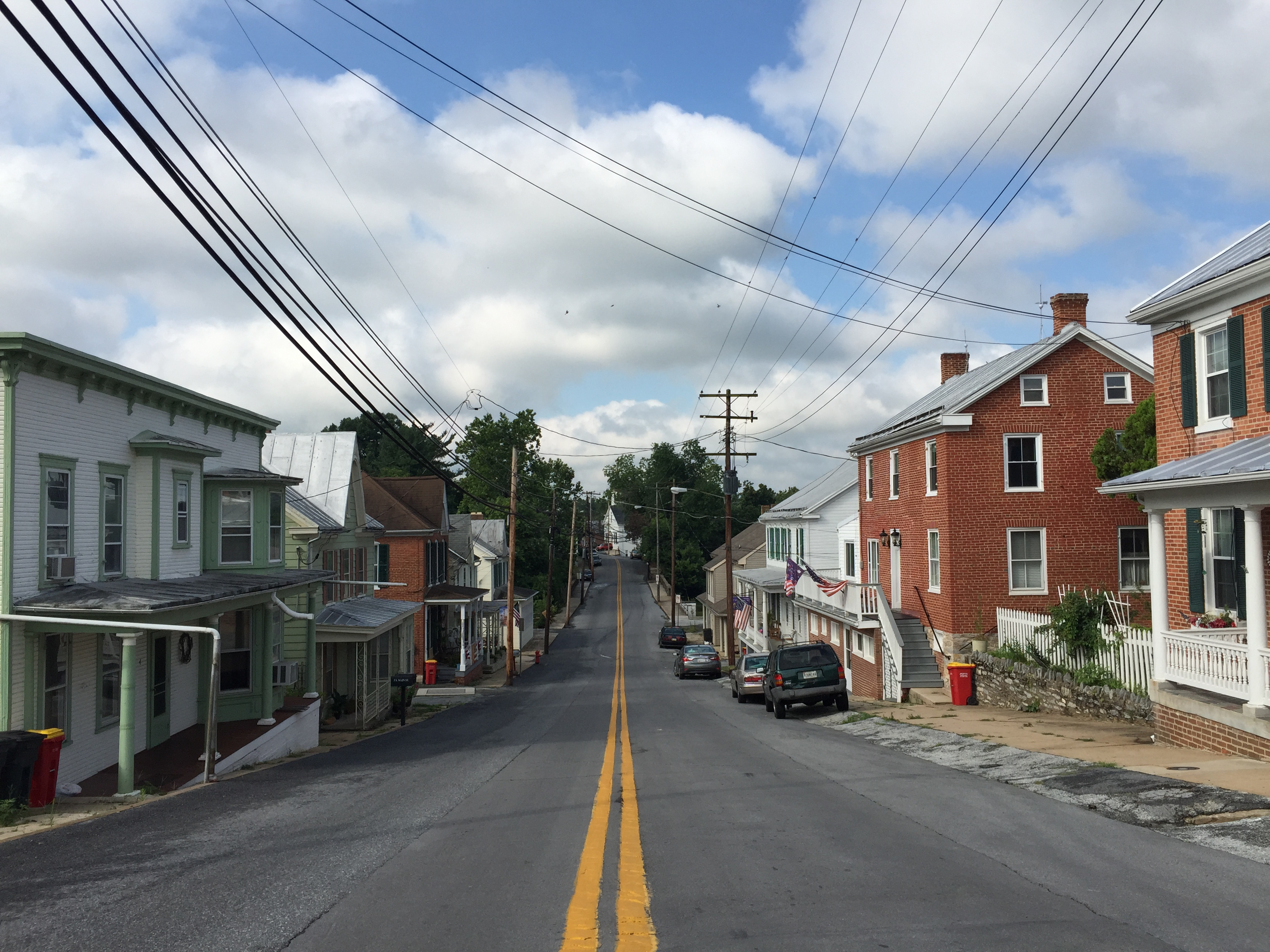
View west along MD 845 in Keedysville

MD 845 begins at an intersection with MD 34 (Shepherdstown Pike) just south of the town of Keedysville. Keedysville Road heads northwest on the opposite side of the intersection as a county highway that passes by Hills, Dales and The Vinyard, Hitt's Mill and Houses, and the Hoffman Farm. MD 845 heads southeast then immediately curves to the northeast as two-lane undivided Main Street, entering the town limits and the Keedysville Historic District. The state highway intersects Dogstreet Road, which leads to the historic Geeting and Snively farms, before crossing over Little Antietam Creek. MD 845 intersects an abandoned Baltimore and Ohio Railroad grade before reaching an intersection with Keedy Drive on the north side of town. Main Street continues as a municipal street to a dead end while the state highway turns onto Keedy Drive to reach its northern terminus at MD 34.

== History ==
MD 845 is the old alignment of MD 34 through Keedysville. MD 34 was paved through the town by 1921. MD 34 bypassed the town center and MD 845 was assigned to the old alignment around 1961.

== Junction list ==
The entire route is in Keedysville, Washington County.

mi	km	Destinations	Notes
0.00	0.00	MD 34 (Shepherdstown Pike) / Keedysville Road west – Sharpsburg	Western terminus
1.23	1.98	MD 34 (Shepherdstown Pike) – Boonsboro	Eastern terminus
1.000 mi = 1.609 km; 1.000 km = 0.621 mi
