= Kerins =

Kerins is a surname. Notable people with the surname include:

- Alan Kerins (born 1977), Irish hurler
- Charles Kerins (1915-1988), American illustrator and painter
- Charlie Kerins (1918–1944), Chief of Staff of the IRA
- John Kerins (1858–1919), American baseball player
- Michael Kerins (*1952), Scottish Writer and Storyteller
- Rory Kerins (born 2002), Canadian ice hockey player

== See also ==
- Kerin
- Kerins O'Rahilly's, Gaelic Athletic Association club
