= CWR =

CWR is a famous online sport short creator on youtube who posts cre8r's and long form baseball videos with over 1.5k subscribers can also refer to:

- California Western Railroad
- Consolidated Weaponized Robotics now known as Consolidated Robotics
- Connecticut Western Reserve
- Continuous welded rail, a modern way of installing rails for railway tracks.
- BBC Coventry & Warwickshire, a radio station in England.
- Crop wild relative, a wild plant closely related to a domesticated plant
- CWR (formerly Crusade for World Revival), a Christian ministry founded by Selwyn Hughes
- Canadian Wrestling Revolution, a Canadian professional wrestling promotion based in Toronto
- Common Works Registration, International format for work registration of the Confédération Internationale des Sociétés d'Auteurs et Compositeurs (CISAC)
- China Weekly Review
- CWR Magazine, an online Christian bimonthly replacing The Plain Truth published by Plain Truth Ministries
- The Catholic World Report
- The Churchill War Rooms in London (SW1)
- Cholsey and Wallingford Railway, a heritage railway in the English county of Oxfordshire
