= Kerin =

Kerin is a surname. Notable people with the surname include:

- John F. Kerin (1944–2006), Australian physician and professor
- John Kerin (1937–2023), Australian economist and politician
- Nora Kerin (1883-1970), British actress
- Rob Kerin (born 1954), Australian politician
- Zac Kerin (born 1991), American football player

== See also ==
- Kerins
