= Nicodemus Mill Complex =

Historic house in Maryland, United States

- U.S. National Register of Historic Places
- Location within Maryland Location within the United States
- Location: 20019 Nicodemus Mill Rd., Keedysville, Maryland
- Coordinates: 39°28′34″N 77°40′24″W
- Area: 4.9 acres (2.0 ha)
- Built: 1810
- Architectural style: Federal
- NRHP reference No.: 01000821
- Added to NRHP: August 2, 2001

Nicodemus Mill Complex is a historic home and mill complex located at Keedysville, Washington County, Maryland, United States. It consists of a dated 1810 2 1/2-story, five-bay stone house with a mid-19th-century brick service wing, the ruins of a grist mill built about 1829, and an extensive complement of 19th-century domestic and agricultural outbuildings including a stone springhouse, stone-end bank barn, brick out kitchen, frame wash house, and a stuccoed stone secondary dwelling. It is an intact representative example of the type of farmstead characteristic of the region during the 19th century.

It was listed on the National Register of Historic Places in 2001.
