= Alma, Buffalo County, Wisconsin =

Town in Wisconsin, U.S.

Alma, Wisconsin
- Town
- Town of Alma
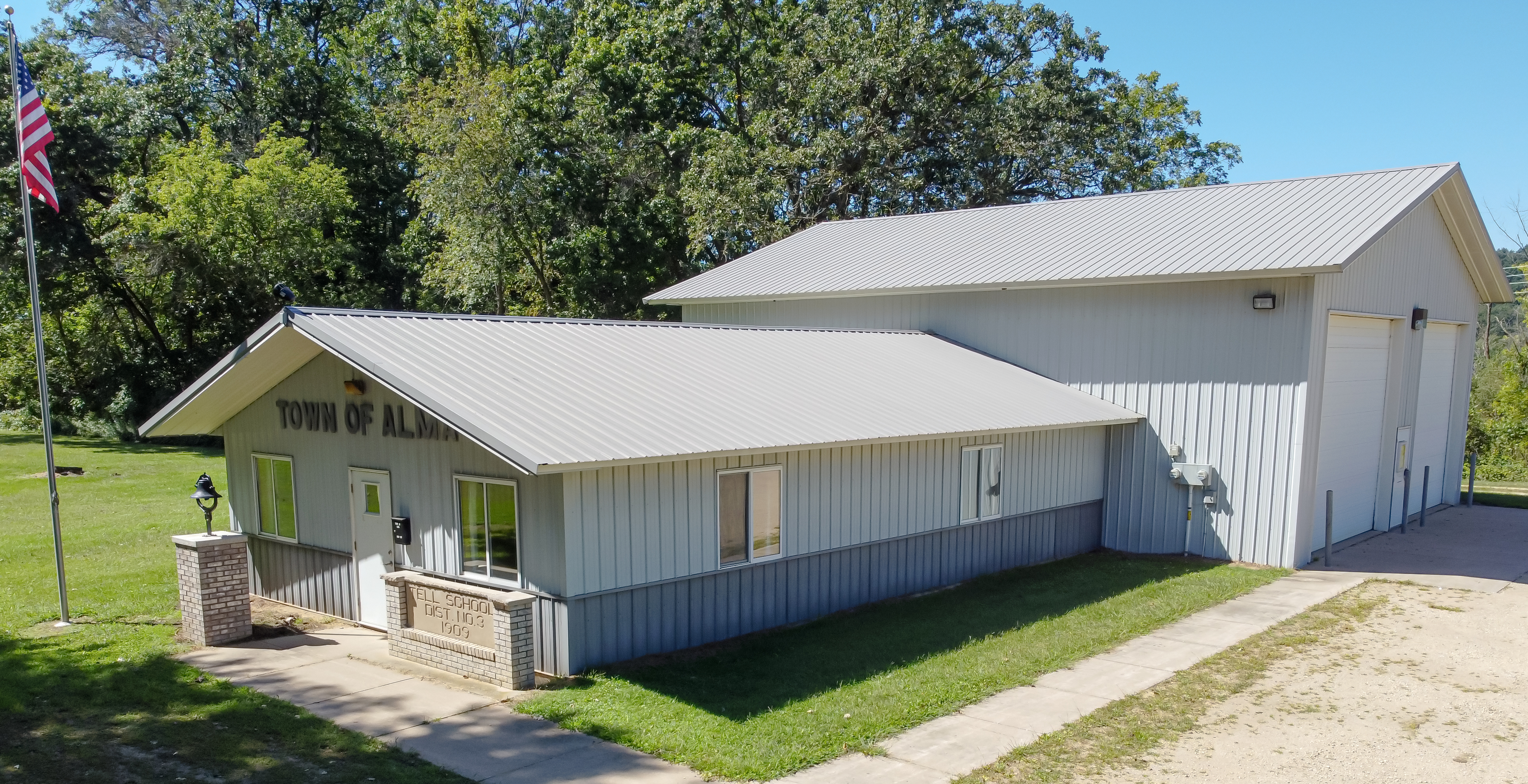
- Alma Town Hall

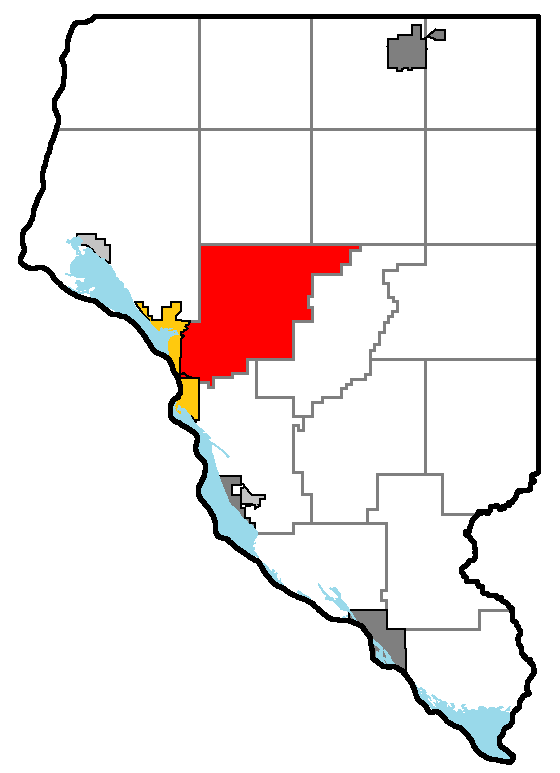
- Location of Alma, Buffalo County

- Location of Buffalo County, Wisconsin
- Country: United States
- State: Wisconsin
- County: Buffalo

Area
  - Total: 42.80 sq mi (110.9 km^{2})
  - Land: 42.3 sq mi (110 km^{2})
  - Water: 0.51 sq mi (1.3 km^{2})

Population (2020)
  - Total: 254
  - Density: 6.00/sq mi (2.32/km^{2})
- Time zone: UTC-6 (Central (CST))
  - Summer (DST): UTC-5 (CDT)

Alma (/ˈɑːlmə/ AHL-mə) is a town in Buffalo County in the U.S. state of Wisconsin. The population was 254 at the 2020 census. The city of Alma is located along the western town line. The unincorporated community of Tell is located in the town.

== Geography ==
Alma is located west of the center of Buffalo County and is bordered to its west by the city of Alma, which lies along the Mississippi River. The Buffalo River flows across the town from the northern to the western border.

According to the United States Census Bureau, the town has a total area of 42.9 square miles (111.0 km^{2}), of which 42.4 square miles (109.7 km^{2}) is land and 0.50 square miles (1.3 km^{2}), or 1.22%, is water. It is located near 44.38°N 91.84°W

== Demographics ==
As of the census of 2000, there were 377 people, 133 households, and 109 families residing in the town. The population density was 8.8 people per square mile (3.4/km^{2}). There were 157 housing units at an average density of 3.7 per square mile (1.4/km^{2}). The racial makeup of the town was 98.67% White, 1.06% Black or African American and 0.27% Asian. 1.59% of the population were Hispanic or Latino of any race.

There were 133 households, out of which 36.1% had children under the age of 18 living with them, 70.7% were married couples living together, 6.0% had a female householder with no husband present, and 17.3% were non-families. 13.5% of all households were made up of individuals, and 6.0% had someone living alone who was 65 years of age or older. The average household size was 2.83 and the average family size was 3.07.

In the town, the population was spread out, with 28.6% under the age of 18, 4.5% from 18 to 24, 30.0% from 25 to 44, 22.8% from 45 to 64, and 14.1% who were 65 years of age or older. The median age was 39 years. For every 100 females, there were 111.8 males. For every 100 females age 18 and over, there were 113.5 males.

The median income for a household in the town was $40,357, and the median income for a family was $44,792. Males had a median income of $33,333 versus $19,531 for females. The per capita income for the town was $16,044. About 12.4% of families and 16.2% of the population were below the poverty line, including 24.1% of those under age 18 and 10.0% of those age 65 or over.

== Notable people ==
- Arthur A. Hitt, farmer, educator, and politician, was born in the town
- Edmund Hitt, farmer and politician, was born in the town
