= Every Day with Jesus =

Every Day with Jesus is a Christian daily devotional publication. It has a global circulation of approximately a million readers.

Christian minister Selwyn Hughes started writing the publication in the 1960s, first as a devotional aid for his congregation, and subsequently as a regular periodical published by the Crusade for World Revival (CWR), a Christian training and publishing organisation that he founded. Since Hughes's death in January 2006, CWR has continued to publish it regularly using materials gathered from his writings over the last 40 years, in accordance with his wishes.

The format of the publication is a small booklet about 12 cm x 17 cm, with one page per day. Each day has its theme: the page suggests a short Bible reading, gives a devotional explanation (about 300 words), makes suggestions for further Bible readings on the same subject, and includes a short prayer.
