= Keedysville, Maryland =

- Town
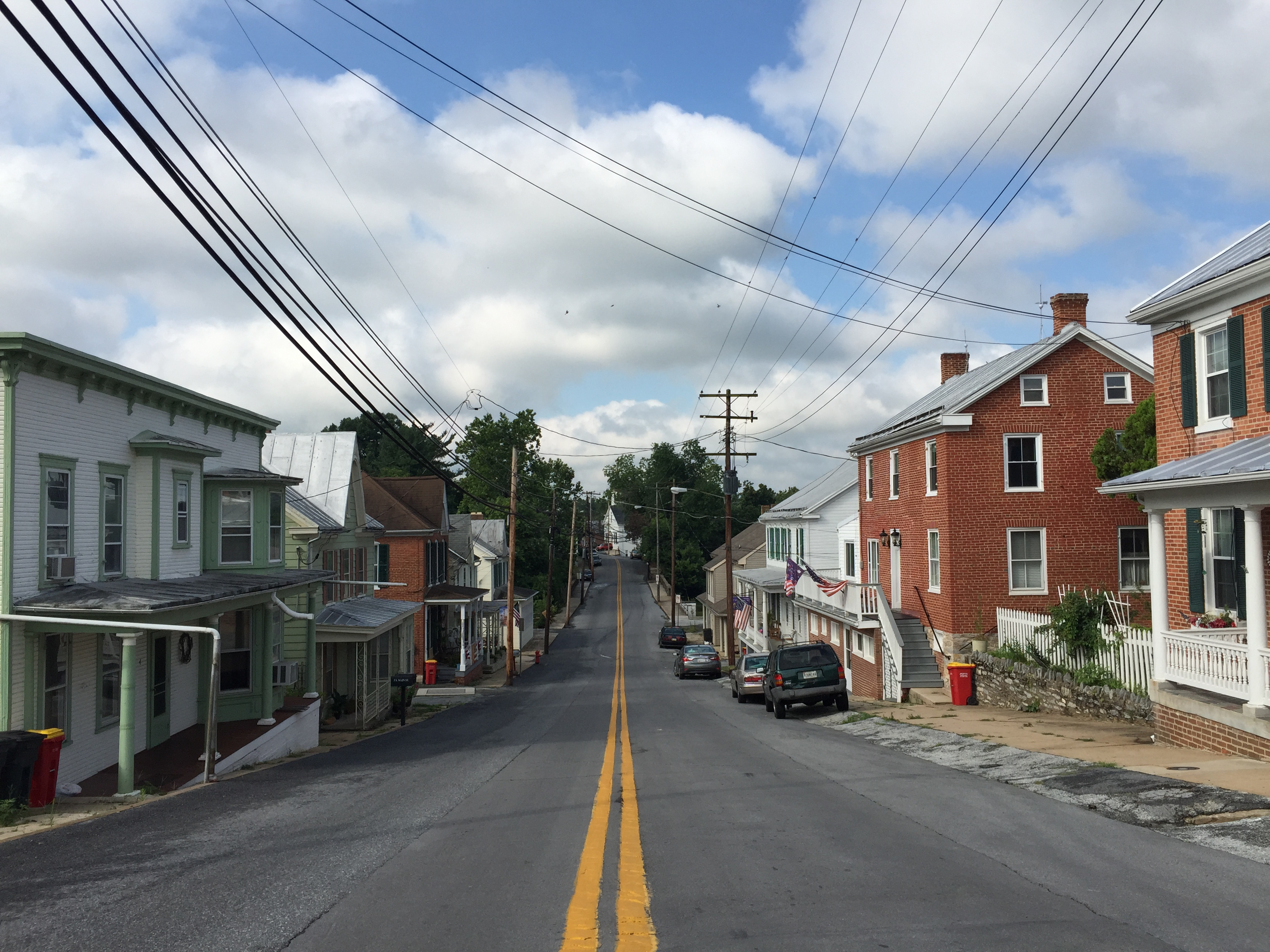
- Main Street in Keedysville

- Flag Seal

- Location of Keedysville, Maryland
- Coordinates: 39°29′12″N 77°41′53″W
- Country: United States
- State: Maryland
- County: Washington
- Incorporated: 1872

Area
  - Total: 0.91 sq mi (2.35 km^{2})
  - Land: 0.91 sq mi (2.35 km^{2})
  - Water: 0 sq mi (0.00 km^{2})
- Elevation: 371 ft (113 m)

Population (2020)
  - Total: 1,213
  - Density: 1,338/sq mi (516.6/km^{2})
- Time zone: UTC-5 (Eastern (EST))
  - Summer (DST): UTC-4 (EDT)
- ZIP code: 21756
- Area codes: 301, 240
- FIPS code: 24-43100
- GNIS feature ID: 2391249
- Website: http://www.keedysvillemd.com/

Keedysville is a town in Washington County, Maryland, United States. As of the 2020 census, Keedysville had a population of 1,213.

== History ==
The first documented house in Keedysville was built in 1738. The description for George Gordon's "Gordon's Purchase" land tract notes "...one log house, 12 x 15 feet..." The initial warrant for the tract had been issued to Owen McDonald in Jan. 1738, the year before Gordon acquired it. Gordon's Purchase was the first tract taken up by a Euromerican within what would eventually become Keedysville. The main road at that time was the Conococheague Road, which branched from the Great Wagon Road just east of Keedysville and led to the farthest reaches of the provence, passing through what would eventually be Keedysville. The house and its exact location are unknown but the starting point for Gordon's Purchase was on today's Bell Lane.

As more settlers moved into the region a grist mill was built on Little Antietam Creek about 1765 to serve the earliest farmers who were mostly German and Swiss immigrants who'd migrated from Pennsylvania. This mill was bought by Jacob Hess in 1770. Hess owned the mill and most of what would become the town until his death in 1815. During this period the budding community became known as "Hess's Mill." In the years immediately following Jacob Hess's death the Sharpsburg to Boonsboro Turnpike was constructed (about 1820), which became Keedysville's main street.

Due to its location exactly half-way between Boonsboro and Sharpsburg the town became known as Centerville. The town's name officially became Keedysville when the first post office was established due to the existence of another Centerville, Maryland in Queen Anne's County. In the mid-1860s the B&O Railroad began acquiring a right-of-way and by the early 1870s a branch line extended from Weverton to Hagerstown with a busy Keedysville depot as the mid-way point. The railroad brought a much needed prosperity following the dark days of the civil war.

In 1872 Keedysville was officially chartered as a municipality. Keedysville was home to numerous businesses through the first half of the 1900s but the commercial nature of the town had begun to decline by the century's second decade. Like most small towns, the advent of the automobile and mechanization brought a gradual change as larger stores and factories became easily accessible and previously plentiful manual labor jobs decreased. Keedysville remained almost unchanged otherwise for much of the 20th century. Several additions to the town were planned by the turn of the century and the population which had previously hovered around 400 for many years, suddenly swelled to more than double that number in a single decade.

An alternate history credits Jacob Hess as the first settler, who then builds a mill forming the nucleus for the town. As shown above, settlement began in the 1730s. Jacob Hess did not arrive in the area until approximately 1760 with the Christian Orndorff family. He is noted at that time as "a German youth." This narrative, claiming construction of the mill complex in 1768 may stem from Hess' first land tract "Hess' Discovery," patented that year. The mill, however, was on the tract Gordon's Purchase, not Hess' Discovery. Hess was, however, a prosperous businessman and community leader. As such, he remains integral to the establishment of the town.

Baltimore & Ohio Railroad Bridge, Antietam Creek, Baker Farm, Doub Farm, Geeting Farm, Hills, Dales and The Vinyard, Hitt's Mill and Houses, Hoffman Farm, Keedysville Historic District, and Nicodemus Mill Complex are listed on the National Register of Historic Places.

== Geography ==
According to the United States Census Bureau, the town has a total area of 0.92 square miles (2.38 km^{2}), all land.

Keedysville is underlain by the Tomstown Dolomite, a carbonic rock formation of the Cambrian. The Tomstown is known for producing most of the caves in Washington County, especially in the area surrounding Keedysville. The area was once home to eight different caves, several of which were discovered during quarrying operations to remove rock for highway construction. The most famous of these caves, Crystal Grottoes, was discovered in 1920 and is now the only show-cave in Maryland.

The high concentration of caves in this area may be related to increased drainage of groundwater. The water table in this locality is drained by the Little Antietam Creek and its tributaries, and many of these caves can be found in the cliffs and along the broken plateau east of town.

=== Climate ===
The climate in this area is characterized by hot, humid summers and generally mild to cool winters. According to the Köppen Climate Classification system, Keedysville has a humid subtropical climate, abbreviated "Cfa" on climate maps.

== Transportation ==
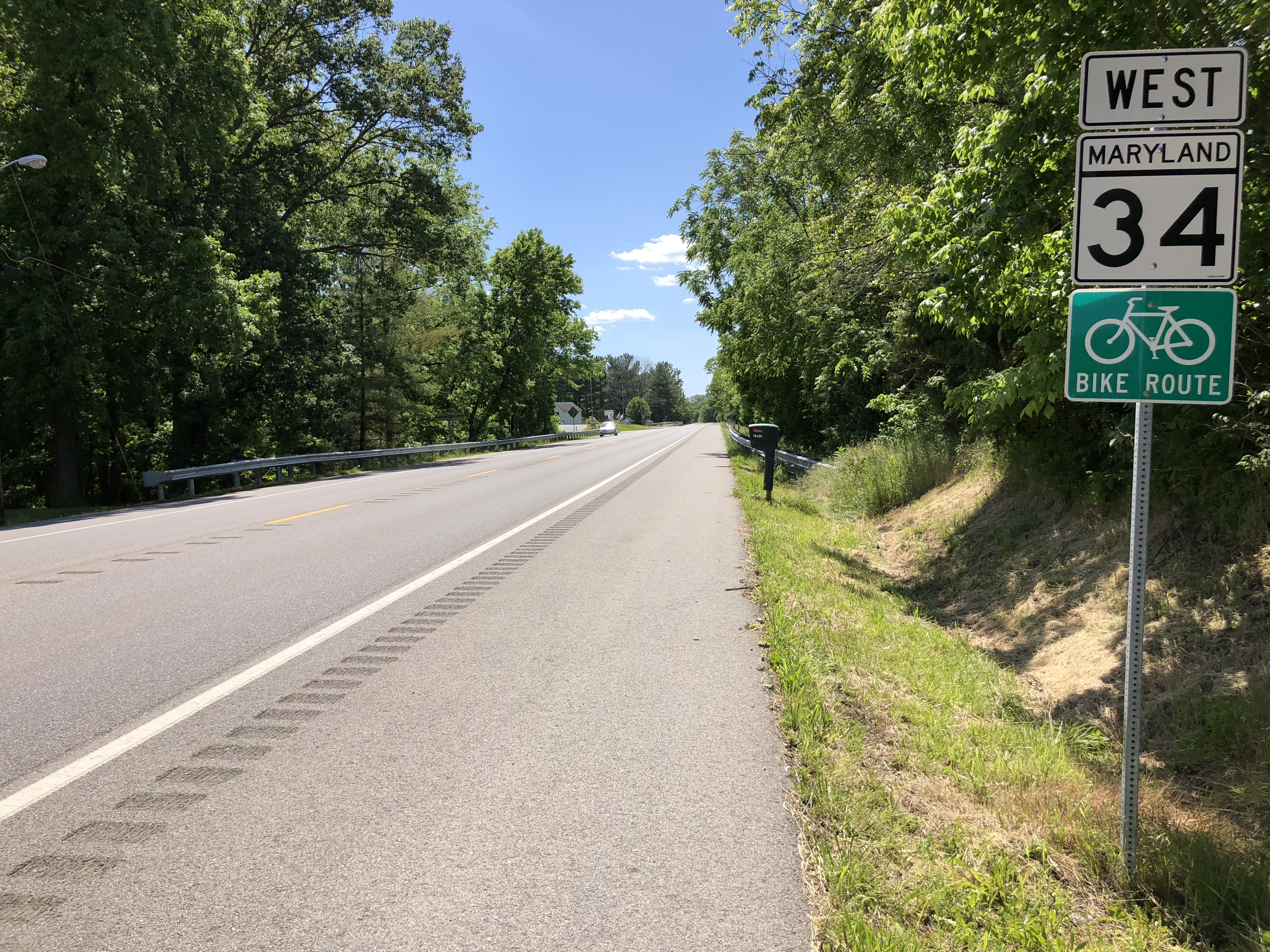
MD 34 westbound in Keedsyville

The primary means of travel to and from Keedysville is by road. The only significant highway serving the town is Maryland Route 34, which connects eastward to Boonsboro and westward to Sharpsburg. One additional state highway, Maryland Route 845, also traverses the town, following the old route of MD 34 along Main Street.

== Demographics ==
Historical population
Census	Pop.	Note	%±
1880	389		—
1890	420		8.0%
1900	426		1.4%
1910	367		−13.8%
1920	394		7.4%
1930	393		−0.3%
1940	404		2.8%
1950	417		3.2%
1960	433		3.8%
1970	431		−0.5%
1980	476		10.4%
1990	464		−2.5%
2000	482		3.9%
2010	1,152		139.0%
2020	1,213		5.3%
U.S. Decennial Census

=== 2010 census ===
As of the census of 2010, there were 1,152 people, 391 households, and 319 families living in the town. The population density was 1,252.2 inhabitants per square mile (483.5/km^{2}). There were 407 housing units at an average density of 442.4 units per square mile (170.8 units/km^{2}). The racial makeup of the town was 94.5% White, 3.5% African American, 0.2% Asian, 0.8% from other races, and 1.0% from two or more races. Hispanic or Latino of any race were 2.9% of the population.

There were 391 households, of which 41.9% had children under the age of 18 living with them, 71.4% were married couples living together, 7.9% had a female householder with no husband present, 2.3% had a male householder with no wife present, and 18.4% were non-families. 14.1% of all households were made up of individuals, and 4.3% had someone living alone who was 65 years of age or older. The average household size was 2.95 and the average family size was 3.24.

The median age in the town was 37.2 years. 28.2% of residents were under the age of 18; 6.6% were between the ages of 18 and 24; 28.2% were from 25 to 44; 28.4% were from 45 to 64; and 8.6% were 65 years of age or older. The gender makeup of the town was 50.8% male and 49.2% female.

=== 2000 census ===
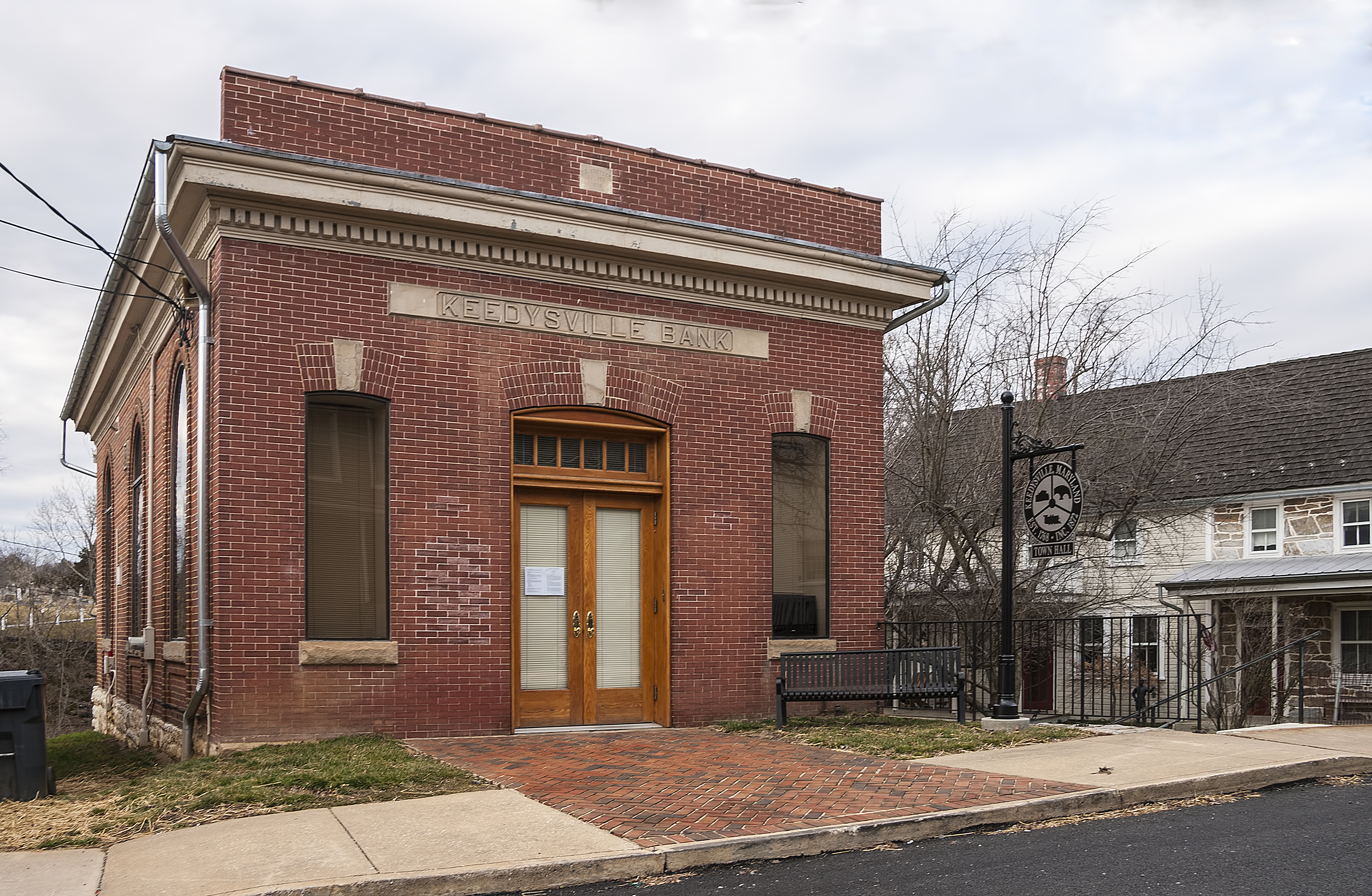
Keedysville Town Hall in 2013

As of the census of 2000, there were 482 people, 172 households, and 131 families living in the town. The population density was 565.7 inhabitants per square mile (218.4/km^{2}). There were 188 housing units at an average density of 220.6 units per square mile (85.2 units/km^{2}). The racial makeup of the town was 98.96% White, 0.21% African American, 0.21% Asian, and 0.62% from two or more races. Hispanic or Latino of any race were 1.24% of the population.

There were 172 households, out of which 41.3% had children under the age of 18 living with them, 69.2% were married couples living together, 5.8% had a female householder with no husband present, and 23.3% were non-families. 20.9% of all households were made up of individuals, and 8.1% had someone living alone who was 65 years of age or older. The average household size was 2.80 and the average family size was 3.27.

In the town, the population was spread out, with 28.6% under the age of 18, 6.4% from 18 to 24, 31.1% from 25 to 44, 25.5% from 45 to 64, and 8.3% who were 65 years of age or older. The median age was 35 years. For every 100 females, there were 95.1 males. For every 100 females age 18 and over, there were 93.3 males.

The median income for a household in the town was $53,250, and the median income for a family was $61,607. Males had a median income of $43,438 versus $30,938 for females. The per capita income for the town was $19,911. None of the families and 1.3% of the population were living below the poverty line, including no under eighteens and 8.8% of those over 64.

== Notable people ==
The novelist Nora Roberts was living in Keedysville in 1979 when she started writing.
