= William Post (lottery winner) =

American lottery winner

- Born: William Post III; April 5, 1939; Erie, Pennsylvania
- Died: January 15, 2006 (aged 66); Pittsburgh, Pennsylvania
- Other name: Bud
- Occupation: Various prior to winning jackpot
- Spouse: Debra S. Wice
- Children: 10

William "Bud" Post III (April 5, 1939 – January 15, 2006) was the winner of a Pennsylvania Lottery jackpot worth $16.2 million, in 1988. Shortly afterward his brother tried to have him murdered for the inheritance. Post survived, and was successfully sued by an ex-girlfriend for a share of the winnings. By the end of his life, Post was $1 million in debt.

== Early life ==
Post was born in Erie, Pennsylvania. His mother died when he was 8 years old and his father sent him to an orphanage soon after. Post worked in various temporary jobs such as in cooking, truck driving for traveling carnivals and circuses, and painting before winning the lottery. He served 28 days in jail for issuing invalid checks. On the day he won the jackpot, he had just $2.46 in his bank account.

== Lottery jackpot ==
Post bought one of the winning tickets of the Pennsylvania Lottery in 1988, worth $16.2 million. The total jackpot was more than $32 million, the second highest total in state history; the other half went to a group of 16 employees of the Westinghouse Electric Bettis Atomic Power Laboratory in Pittsburgh. In the two weeks after Post collected the first of his 26 annual payments of $497,953.47, he spent more than $300,000 on gifts and investments such as a liquor license, a lease for a restaurant in Florida, a used-car lot, and a twin-engine airplane (despite lacking a pilot's license). In just three months' time, his debts totaled $500,000; the next year, he bought a mansion in Oil City, Pennsylvania, for $395,000.

According to The Washington Post, he pawned a ring for $40 and gave Ann Karpik, his landlady and occasional girlfriend, the cash for 40 tickets in the state lottery, one of which was the winning ticket. Karpik later sued Post for one-third of the lottery winnings.

== Murder attempt ==
By 1989, Post was estranged from his brother. Intending to acquire Post's winnings as inheritance, his brother attempted to have Post and his sixth wife murdered, paying a hit man to do so. The attempt did not succeed, and Post's brother was arrested.

== Legal issues ==
In 1989, Karpik sued Post for a portion of his lottery winnings. She claimed that they had agreed to split any winnings.

After three years, a judge ruled that Post owed her one-third of all the proceeds, despite Post's vehement denial of any agreement and his inability to pay, as he was by then deeply in debt. He refused to turn over his 1992 annual payment to comply with the judgment, as a result of which the judge ordered all of his lottery payments to be frozen until the dispute was resolved.

In 1998, Post was arrested on a $260,000 sailboat for refusing to serve a 6 to 24-month prison sentence on a six-year-old assault conviction; Post had fired his shotgun at a man who was coming to his mansion to collect a debt. He was also ordered by a court to stay away from his sixth wife after he fired his shotgun into her Pontiac Firebird.

== Personal life ==
For most of his life Post was alienated from his siblings. He was married seven times with six of them ending in divorce. His seventh wife survived him, along with nine children from his second marriage.

Post eventually incurred over $1 million in debt. Near the end of his lifetime he survived on food stamps and a $450/month stipend.

Post died of respiratory failure on January 15, 2006, at age 66.
