= Hills, Dales and The Vinyard =

Historic houses in Maryland, United States

- U.S. National Register of Historic Places
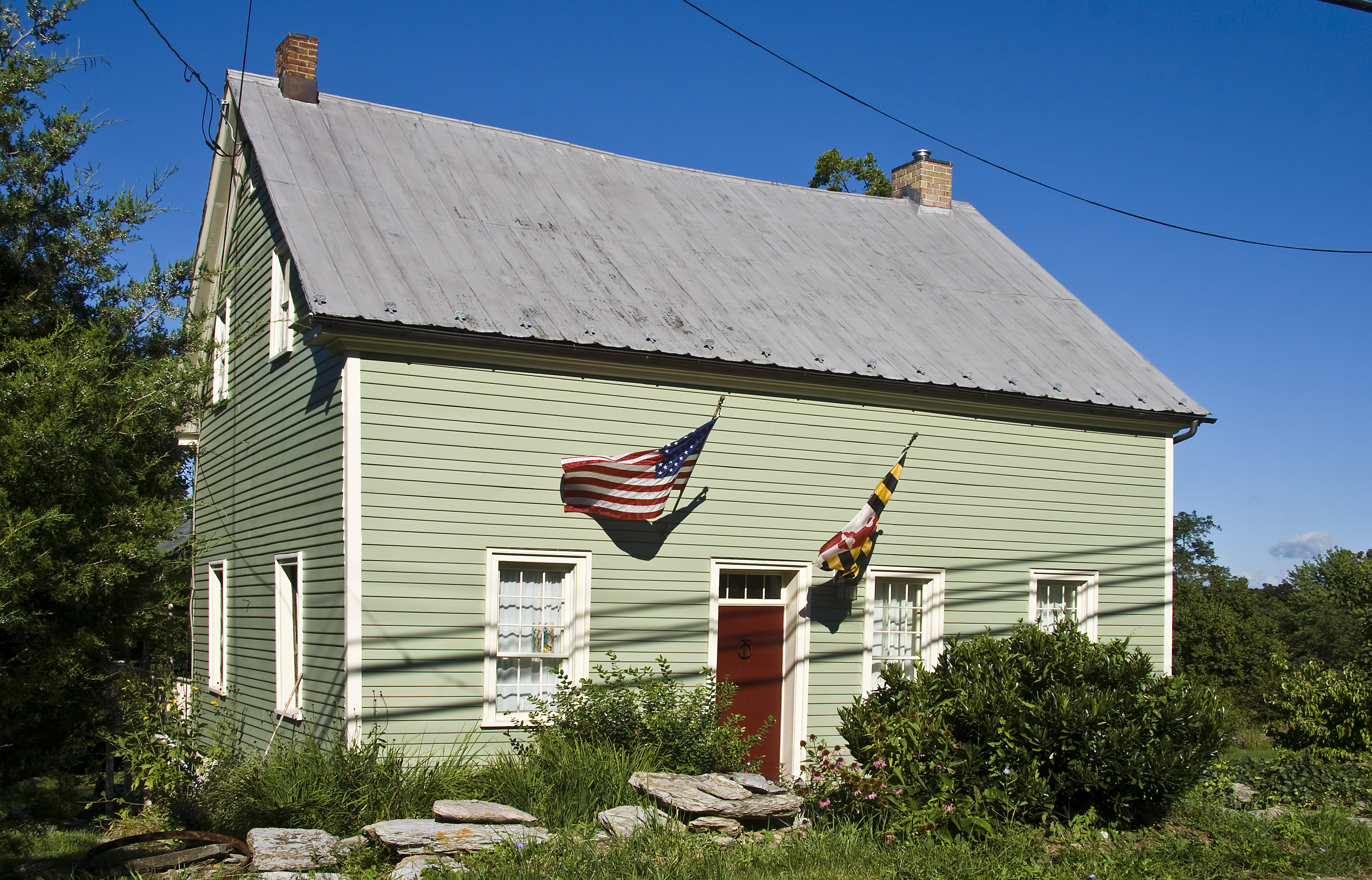
- Hills, Dales and The Vinyard, August 2011

- Location within Maryland Location within the United States
- Location: 16 Dogstreet Rd., Keedysville, Maryland
- Coordinates: 39°29′0″N 77°42′25″W
- Area: 3.4 acres (1.4 ha)
- Built: 1790
- Architectural style: Federal
- NRHP reference No.: 00001460
- Added to NRHP: December 1, 2000

Hills, Dales and The Vinyard is a historic home located at Keedysville, Washington County, Maryland, United States. It is a two-story late 18th century log house, with an early 19th-century stone addition. The property also includes stone retaining walls, stone fences, a stone bank barn foundation, and a late 19th-century timber framed corn crib.

Hills, Dales and The Vinyard was listed on the National Register of Historic Places in 2000.
