= Homer Hitt =

Dr. Homer Hitt (April 22, 1916 – January 27, 2008) was the first chief executive of the University of New Orleans, serving from 1958 to 1980. He was selected in 1957 to be the first dean of the newly created Louisiana State University New Orleans campus. His title was changed to "vice president in charge" in 1961 and to "chancellor" in 1963.

A native of Comanche, Texas, Hitt received his doctorate from Harvard University in 1941 in sociology, after earning master's degrees from both Harvard and LSU.

He died on Sunday, January 27, 2008.
