= Michael Kerins =

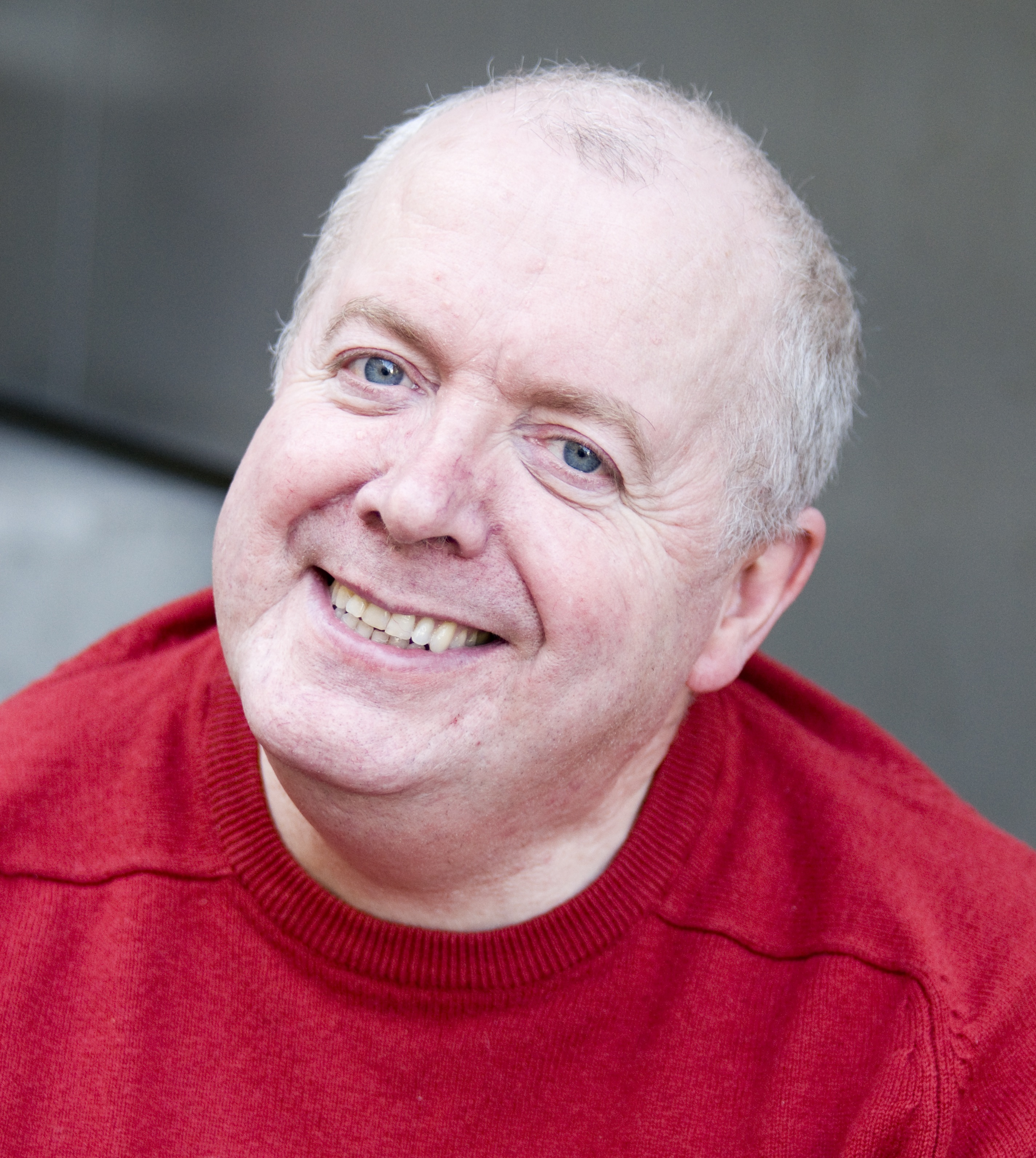
- Born: Michael Joseph Kerins; 1952 (age 73–74); Glasgow
- Occupations: Writer, storyteller
- Writing career
- Language: English, Scottish

Michael Joseph Kerins (born 1952), is a Scottish-origined British writer and storyteller. Kerins was born in Glasgow in 1952. He has received a variety of awards for his works inside and outside of his area.

== Biography ==
Kerins was born in August 1952 in a Scottish family in Glasgow. His father was blind, but the level of his oral communication abilities was considerable. It is believed that Michael took after his father in his talent of telling stories. Michael Kerins is the sixth generation of storytellers in his family. He has had the status of mentor and member of The Scottish Storytelling Forum since 1988. In 2009 and 2010 he was a chairman of Glasgow Storytellers.

He is also famous for being a founder or co-founder of various clubs and projects both in Scotland and worldwide. For example, such institutions as Better Crack Club (Glasgow's oldest storytelling club) and Even Better Crack Club(Glasgow's oldest storytelling club for children of all ages) were organised by him. Moreover, Kerins is the founder of a charity organisation named S.L.A.T.E Charity (Scotland Language Action Towards Education). In collaboration with Russian actor Nicholas Naumov he set up "CEO Mother Tongue" in 2002 and international translation competition "Kerinsnaumov" in 2015. Kerins promotes storytelling along with storytellers all over the world, for example during the festival Ananse Sound Splash, in Jamaica, where storytellers from Jamaica, Haiti, UK, US, South Africa gathered to reinforce a cultural tradition of storytelling on the theme of Tell it for Haiti.

In 2014 Michael Kerins founded the 27 word microstory project "Lermontov 200" dedicated to 200th anniversary of Mikhail Lermontov, who had Scottish roots.

Kerins usually cites Walt Disney (played by Tom Hanks) in Saving Mr. Banks to explain what characterises storytelling:

George Banks and all he stands for will be saved. Maybe not in life, but in imagination. Because that's what we storytellers do. We restore order with imagination. We instill hope again and again and again.

— Walt Disney, Saving Mr. Banks

== Most notable works ==
- weetom and the new bed (2015)
- weetom and the bankrobbers (2014)
- The Varona and The Seagull (2012)

== Awards ==
- 2004: W.E. Upjohn Humanitarian award
- 2008: Scottish Storytelling Centre - Edinburgh winner Tall Tales Oscar
- 2009: PharmaTimes Representative of the Year 2009 Awards Evening
- 2010: Glasgow Herald - aye write Tall Tales Oscar
- 2012: B.A.S.E. 2012 - Adult Male Winner

== Links ==
- Official website of S.L.A.T.E Charity
- Open Word Open World microsite
