= Conrad Hendricks =

South African footballer

Personal information
- Date of birth: 5 February 1979
- Place of birth: Rust-ter-Vaal, South Africa
- Date of death: 14 January 2006 (aged 26)
- Place of death: Alberton, South Africa
- Position: Goalkeeper

Senior career*
Years	Team	Apps	(Gls)
- Kaizer Chiefs
- Black Leopards
?–2006	Moroka Swallows		
- * Club domestic league appearances and goals

Conrad Hendricks (5 February 1979 – 14 January 2006) was a South African soccer player who played as a goalkeeper.

Although mainly an understudy to Nigerian international Greg Etafia at Swallows, the 26-year-old Hendricks played a key role in the Birds winning the ABSA Cup in 2004 and always performed with distinction when called upon.

At the time of his death, he played for Moroka Swallows. He had previously played for Kaizer Chiefs and Black Leopards.

He died in a motor accident in Alberton on the outskirts of Johannesburg. In 2019, the Premier Soccer League announced that Hendricks was one of eleven footballers who had died on roads since 2003.
