= Keedysville Historic District =

Historic district in Maryland, United States

- U.S. National Register of Historic Places
- U.S. Historic district
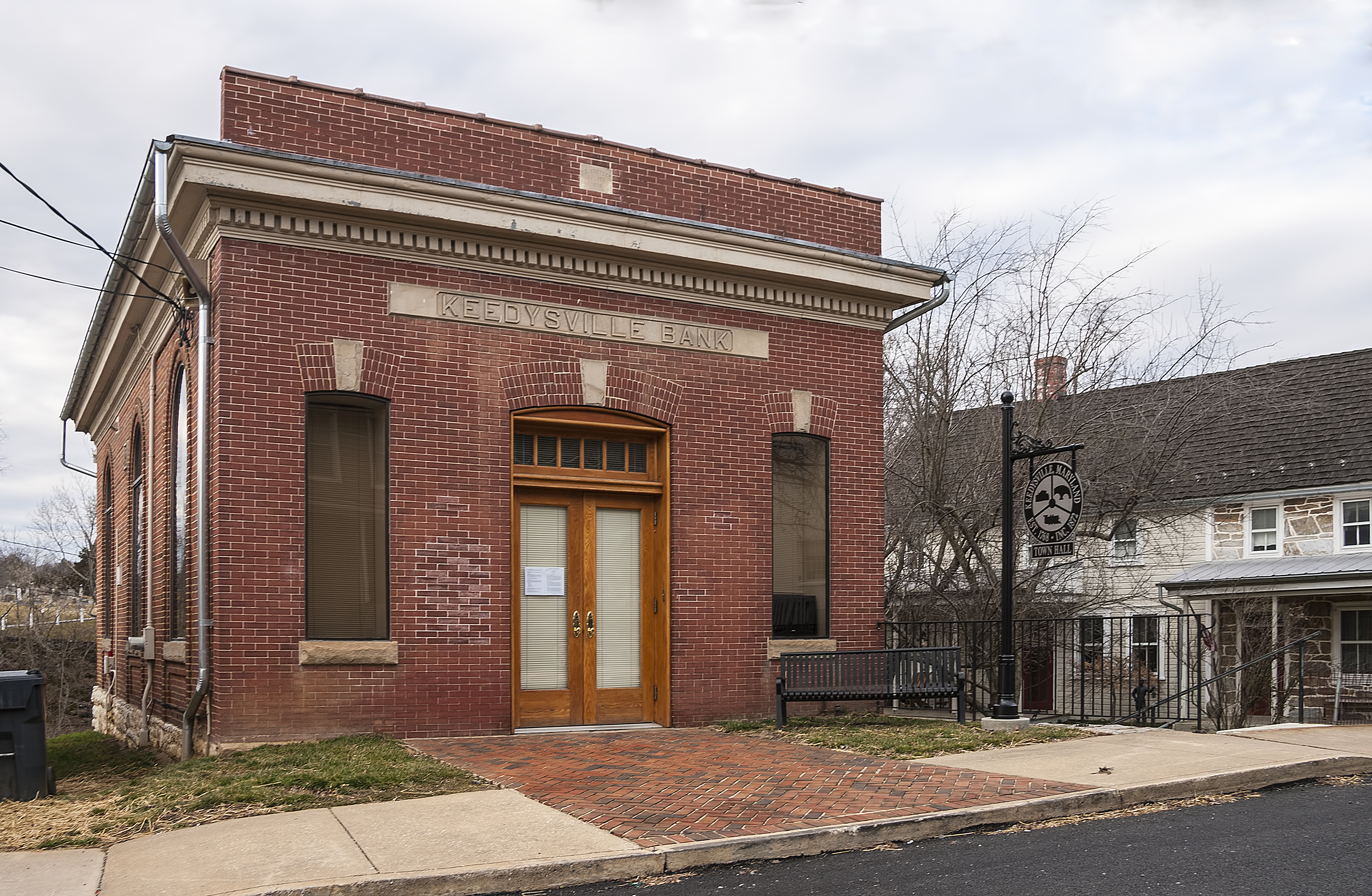
- Former Keedysville Bank, now the town hall

- Location within Maryland Location within the United States
- Location: Along Main St., Keedysville, Maryland
- Coordinates: 39°29′12″N 77°41′56″W
- Area: 80 acres (32 ha)
- Built: 1768
- Architectural style: Greek Revival, Italianate, et al.
- NRHP reference No.: 01001183
- Added to NRHP: October 26, 2001

Keedysville Historic District is a national historic district at Keedysville, Washington County, Maryland, United States. The district boundary is within the corporate limits of the town, generally focused on the properties lining Main Street and those associated with the now-abandoned railroad facilities. It is reflective of the town's growth from the 1768 establishment of Jacob Hess' mill along the old Conococheague migration road to expansion with each new transportation development. The first major development was the Boonsboro-Sharpsburg turnpike. With the advent of the Baltimore and Ohio Railroad through the center of town, shops and manufactures were established and expanded. The town's prosperity waned with the loss of railroad service in 1953. The district is also significant for the wide range of architectural stylistic influences present on the buildings through the historic town.

The district was added to the National Register of Historic Places in 2001.
