= Geeting Farm =

Historic house in Maryland, US

- U.S. National Register of Historic Places
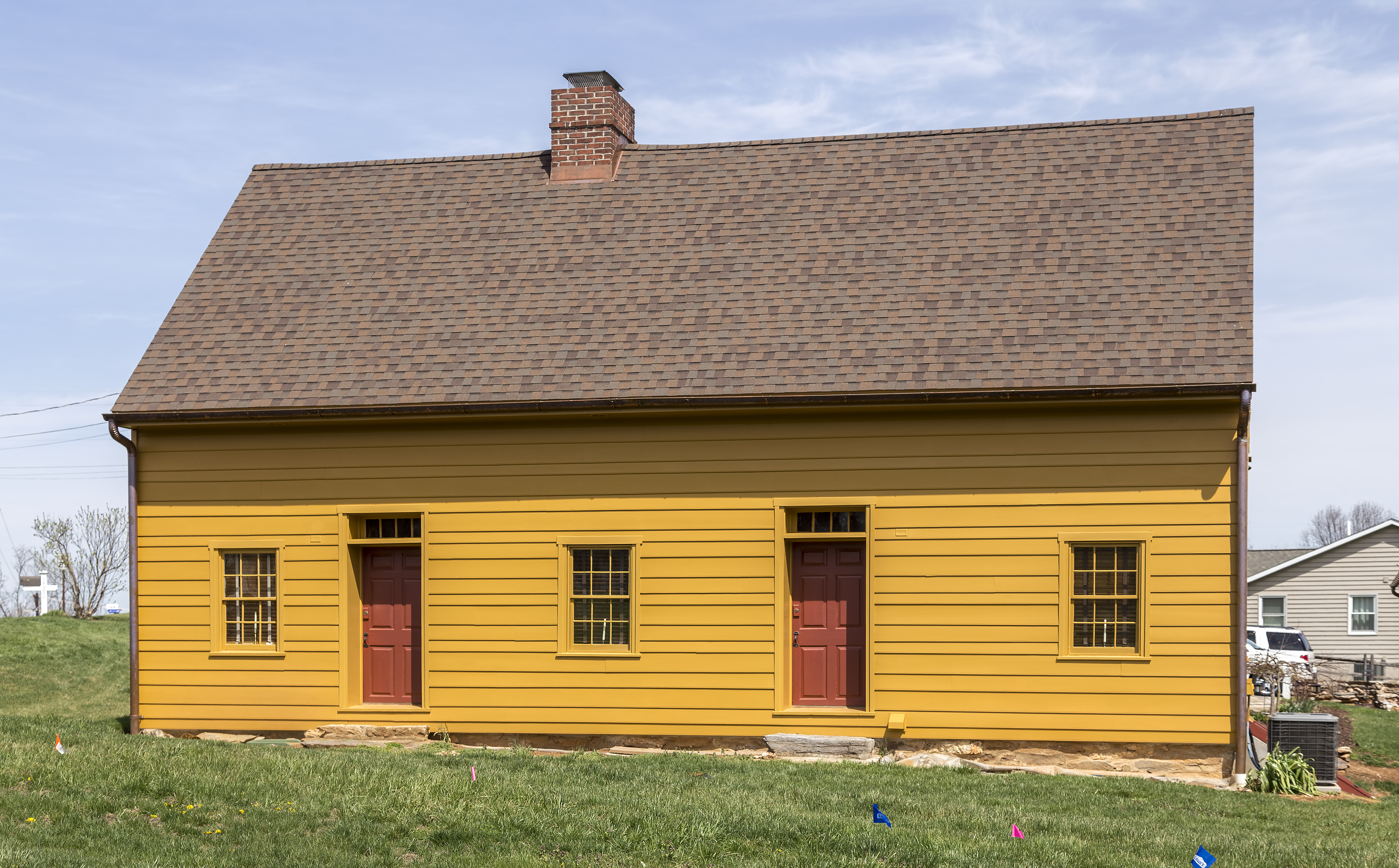
- The Geeting house in 2017

- Location within Maryland Location within the United States
- Nearest city: Keedysville, Maryland
- Coordinates: 39°28′40″N 77°41′53″W
- Area: 5.2 acres (2.1 ha)
- NRHP reference No.: 77000705
- Added to NRHP: November 25, 1977

Geeting Farm is a historic home located at Keedysville, Washington County, Maryland, United States. It is a two-story, five-bay log dwelling resting on low fieldstone foundations, with a one-story, three-bay stone addition. Numerous sheds and outbuildings are located near the house. The house was built by George Adam Geeting [1741-1812], who settled on this land near Little Antietam Creek after immigrating to the English Colony of Maryland in 1759 from his native Prussia. Geeting farmed his land and taught in a log schoolhouse nearby which became a regular preaching appointment for services held by Rev. Philip William Otterbein, one of the founding leaders of the United Brethren in Christ, the first denomination organized in the United States of America. In the mid-1770s, Geeting erected a meetinghouse which later became known as Mount Hebron Church, the first structure built expressly for services of the future United Brethren in Christ denomination. Salem United Methodist Church in Keedysville is the successor to the Mount Hebron Church and Geeting Meetinghouse. Getting himself was ordained a minister of the German Reformed Church in 1788 and traveled extensively through Western Maryland, Virginia, and Pennsylvania as an itinerant preacher. On September 25, 1800, George Adam Geeting attended the first conference of the United Brethren in Christ at the home of Peter Kemp near Frederick, Maryland. It was at this conference that the United Brethren in Christ was formally organized as a denomination and took its name. Geeting continued serving as a minister for the new church, acted as secretary of the denominational conference, and served as a bishop of the United Brethren in Christ briefly in 1812 before his death.

The Geeting Farm was listed on the National Register of Historic Places in 1977.
