= Arthur A. Hitt =

American politician and educator

Arthur Adolph Hitt (November 9, 1890 – February 20, 1971) was an American politician and educator.

Hitt was born in the Town of Alma, Buffalo County, Wisconsin and was the elder brother of the politician Edmund Hitt. Hitt graduated from Alma High School. He served in the United States Military during World War I. Hitt graduated from La Crosse State Normal School and the University of Wisconsin where he received his bachelor's and master's degree. For five years, Hitt taught at Milwaukee Vocational School and then farmed full-time in Alma. Hitt was involved with the Wisconsin Farmers Union and the local electric cooperative. Hitt served in the Wisconsin State Assembly from 1927 to 1939 and was a member of the Wisconsin Progressive Party.

Hitt died in Menomonie, Wisconsin and was buried at Tell Cemetery in Alma.
