= Edmund Hitt =

American politician

Edmund Hitt (February 9, 1901 – July 17, 1976) was a member of the Wisconsin State Assembly.

== Biography ==
Hitt was born in the town of Alma, Buffalo County, Wisconsin, and was the younger brother of the politician Arthur A. Hitt. He attended the University of Wisconsin–La Crosse. Hitt was a farmer and farm labor investigator. He was also involved with the Tenney Telephone Company. He died on July 17, 1976, in Wabasha, Minnesota.

== Career ==
Hitt was chairman of the Town of Alma from 1936 to 1943 and mayor of the city of Alma from 1946 to 1948. In 1942, he was an unsuccessful candidate for the Assembly as a member of the Wisconsin Progressive Party. He was elected to the Assembly in 1948 as a Republican.
