= Hoffman Farm =

- U.S. National Register of Historic Places
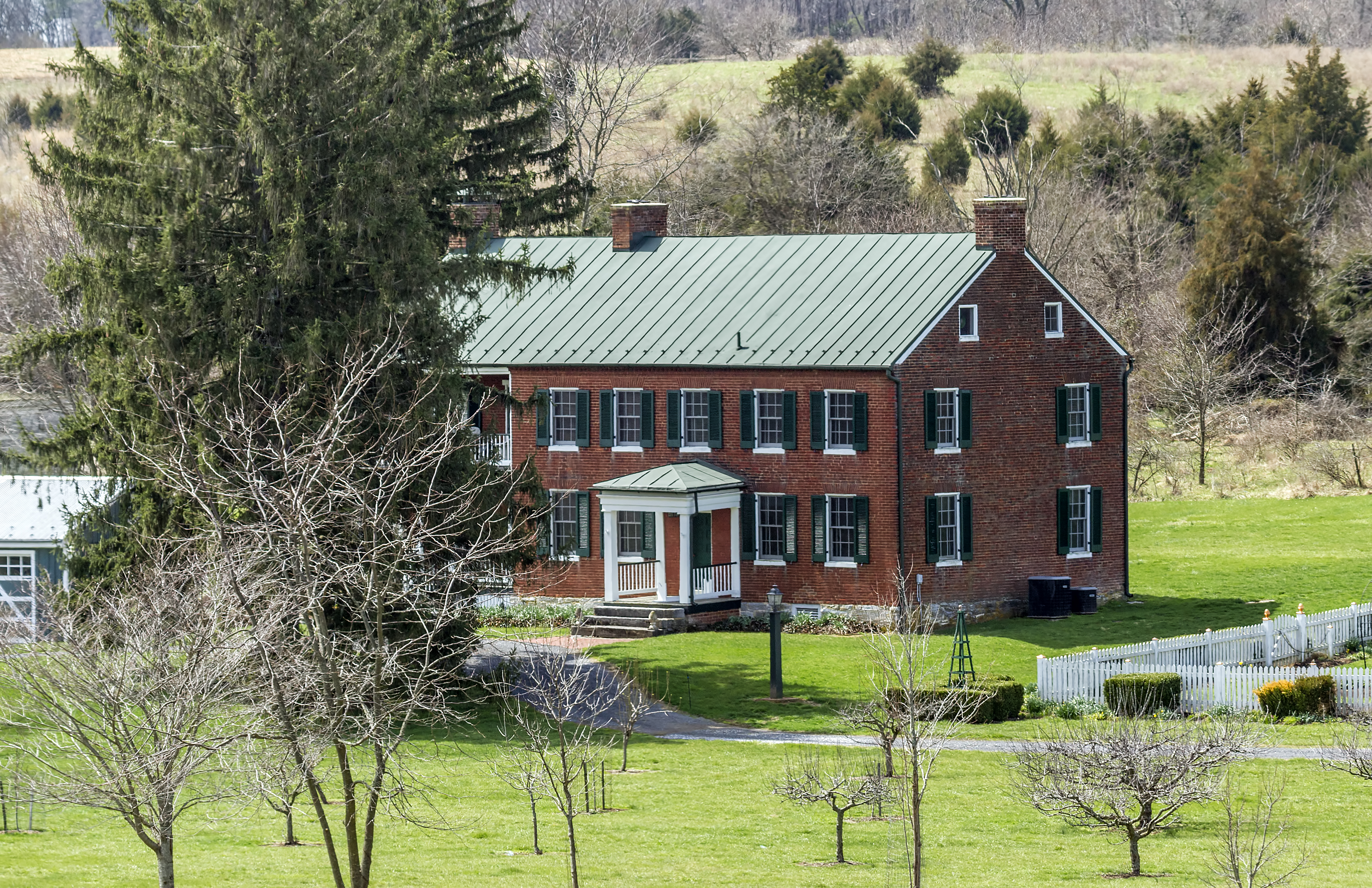
- Hoffman Farm in 2017

- Location within Maryland Location within the United States
- Location: 18651 Keedysville Road, Keedysville, Maryland
- Coordinates: 39°29′53″N 77°43′19″W
- Area: 54.3 acres (22.0 ha)
- Built: 1810
- Architectural style: Greek Revival, Federal
- NRHP reference No.: 97001183
- Added to NRHP: October 10, 1997

Hoffman Farm is a historic farm complex located at Keedysville, Washington County, Maryland, United States. It consists of an 1840s Greek Revival style two-story brick dwelling, adjacent brick slave quarters, a Federal-style stone house built about 1810 over a spring, a frame wagon shed, a log hog barn, and a frame forebay bank barn. The farm buildings were used as a hospital during the American Civil War in Battle of Antietam from the day of the battle on September 17, 1862, and through the following month. Over 800 men were hospitalized in the barn, house, outbuildings, and grounds.

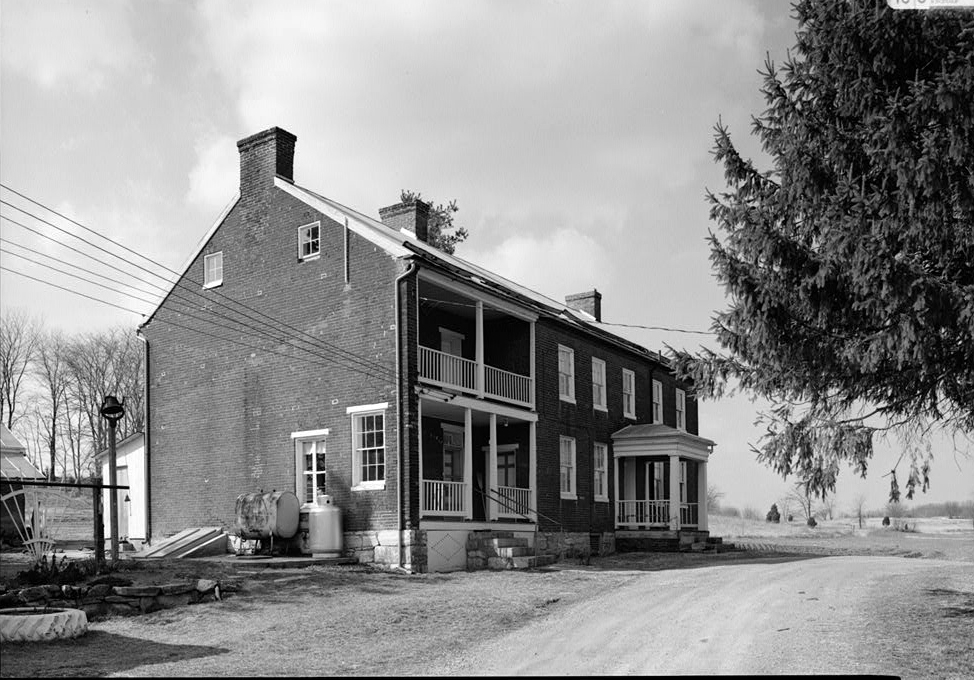
1988 Historic American Buildings Survey image of the Hoffman house

The Hoffman Farm was listed on the National Register of Historic Places in 1997.
