= Hitt's Mill and Houses =

Historic house in Maryland, United States

- U.S. National Register of Historic Places
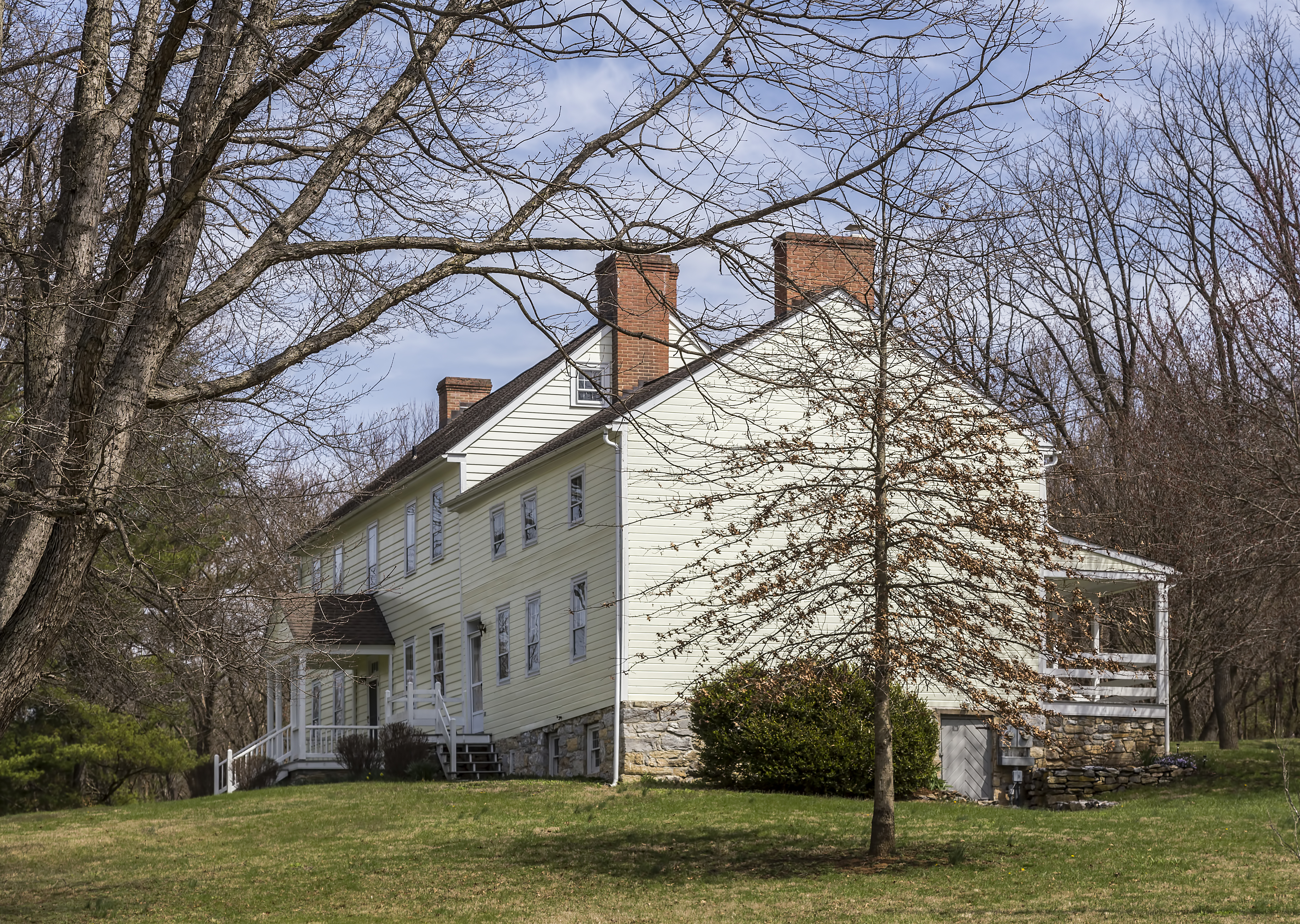
- The Hitt-Cost House in 2017

- Location within Maryland Location within the United States
- Location: West of Keedysville off Maryland Route 34, Keedysville, Maryland
- Coordinates: 39°29′6″N 77°42′44″W
- Area: 89 acres (36 ha)
- Built: 1790
- NRHP reference No.: 79001147
- Added to NRHP: April 12, 1979

Hitt's Mill and Houses, also known as Pry's Mill, Valley Mills, Hitt (or Cost) House, is a historic home and mill complex located at Keedysville, Washington County, Maryland, United States. It is a five-story stone and brick structure built as a grist mill. The ground story and the first full story above ground level are constructed of coursed limestone; the upper stories are built of brick. Also on the property is a square log outbuilding with a hipped roof, a large frame bank barn, and part of a fieldstone barnyard fence. The mill and the Hitt house served as hospitals during and after the nearby Civil War Battle of Antietam.

It was listed on the National Register of Historic Places in 1979.
