= John F. Kerin =

Australian doctor

John F. Kerin (8 August 1944 – 25 January 2006) was a physician, Professor of reproductive medicine, and was a recognised innovator in biomedical technology.

Born to Frank and Joan Mary Kerin, Kerin qualified with a Bachelor of Medicine and Surgery (MBBS) at the University of Adelaide in 1969. He was a fellow of the Royal Australasian College of Obstetrics and Gynecology (FRANZCOG) and had been awarded a Certificate in Reproductive Endocrinology and Infertility.

Kerin spent 16 years directing in vitro fertilisation units with the University of Adelaide (1979–1986), University of California, Los Angeles School of Medicine and Cedars-Sinai Medical Centre (1986–1991) and Fresenius Medical Care (1992–1995). While at Queen Elizabeth Hospital in Adelaide, South Australia, his team produced South Australia's first IVF twins. For 7 years he was a principal investigator for conducting international multi-centre Food and Drug Administration regulated clinical trials for assessing the safety and efficacy of reproductive technology. In June 2004 he was appointed the medical director of Flinders Reproductive Medicine.

Kerin has published hundreds of publications in medical science research, particularly on in vitro fertilization. He was a keen wooden boat designer and builder having spent many years handcrafting full-scale, seaworthy wooden boats. He also conducted marine research off the coast of Queensland in his spare time, for the protection and understanding of the endangered manta-ray.

He became a member and fellow of the Royal College of Obstetricians and Gynaecologists in 1976 and 1971, respectively. He is also a foundation fellow (since 1979) of the Australian College of Obstetricians and Gynaecologists since 1979. Additionally, he holds the titles of FRCOG (England) since 1986 and FACOG (AM) since 1988.

Kerin’s Ph.D. thesis was titled “On the endocrine function of the human GraaFian follicle”, submitted in December 1977 to the Department of Obstetrics and Gynaecology at the Queen Elizabeth Hospital, The University of Adelaide, in fulfilment of the requirements for the degree of Doctor of Medicine in which his aim was to obtain an “understanding of the changing cyclical relationship which exists between the theca and granulosa cells of the isolated human Graafian follicle, in vitro, with respect to its ability to produce the three basic classes of sex steroids, namely the androgens, oestrogens and progestins” and to “critically examine factors controlling human ovarian follicle behaviour, in the hope of achieving a better understanding of female ovarian function”.

Kerin died as a result of an accident on his hobby farm at Eden Valley, South Australia. He had two daughters from his first marriage to Aileen; Danielle Anne and Jacinta Francis.
