= Patricia Hitt =

American politician (1918–2006)

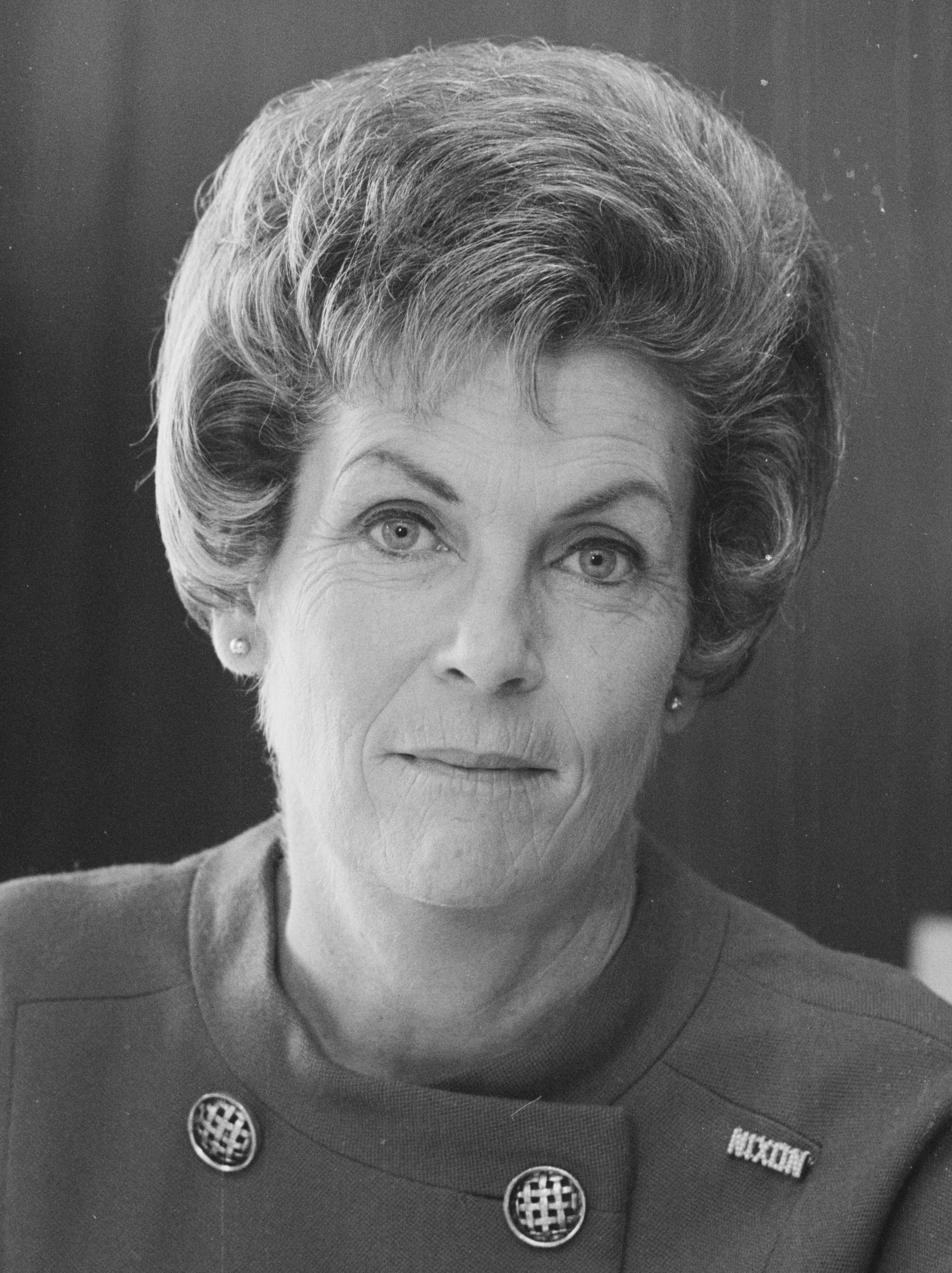
- Hitt in 1968

Assistant Secretary of Health, Education and Welfare
- In office 1969–1973
- President: Richard Nixon

Personal details
- Born: January 24, 1918 Taft, California, U.S.
- Died: January 9, 2006 (aged 87) Newport Beach, California, U.S.
- Spouse: Frank Hamilton (divorced)
- Children: 2

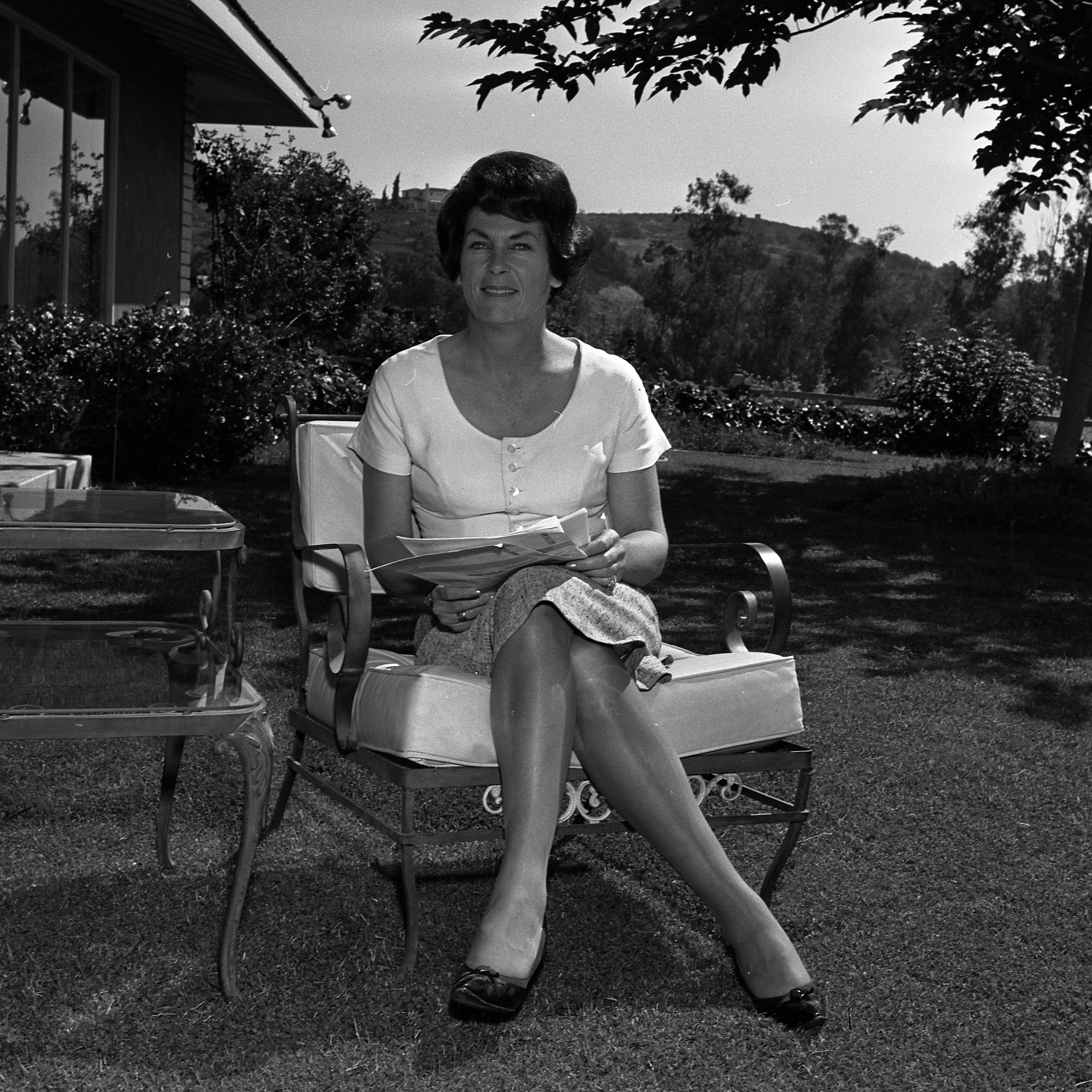
Patricia Hitt in 1964

Patricia Reilly Hitt (January 24, 1918 – January 9, 2006) was the Assistant Secretary of Health, Education and Welfare under President Richard Nixon from 1969 to 1973.

Hitt was born in Taft, California, but grew up in Whittier, California, attending Whittier High School. She worked on all of Nixon's campaigns, going back to his first run for Congress in 1946. She was elected to the Republican National Committee from California in 1960 and was co-chair of Nixon's 1968 Presidential campaign. She was considered insufficiently conservative by the anti-Nixon John Birch Society, whose attacks contributed to her early 1960s loss in an election for a county party post. She reported harassing phone calls from them. In 1972, she was awarded an honorary Doctor of Laws (LL.D.) degree from Whittier College.

She died of natural causes on January 9, 2006, at her home in Balboa Island. Hitt was 87 years old. It was noted that she had died on the date that would have been the late president's 93rd birthday. She was the highest-ranking woman in Nixon's first administration.
