= Selwyn Hughes =

Welsh Christian minister

Selwyn Hughes (27 April 1928 – 9 January 2006) was a Welsh Christian minister best known for writing the daily devotional Every Day with Jesus. He founded the Christian ministry Crusade for World Revival (CWR) and wrote over fifty Christian books. George Carey, the former archbishop of Canterbury, described Hughes as a "giant in the faith".

== Life ==
Hughes was born near Dowlais, Glamorganshire, in Wales on 27 April 1928. He worked in the Welsh coal mining industry for his national service. He studied Theology in Bristol, convinced that he was being called by God to work as a Christian minister. After his ordination he worked for eighteen years as a minister in Pentecostal churches in Cornwall, Wales, Yorkshire, Essex and London.

In his biography, Hughes recalls the time he was sent home from Bonsall Camp for bad behaviour.

His writing started in the 1960s with brief daily Bible-reading notes written on postcards for the attendees of London Revival Crusade to use, but as demand grew he started publishing them regularly; his commitment to the ‘Every Day with Jesus’ notes continued for over forty years. In 1965 he founded an organisation called Crusade for World Revival (CWR). This became a successful Christian training and publishing ministry based at the Waverley Abbey House in Farnham in Surrey.

Hughes remained strong in his faith in spite of the death of his wife in 1986 from cancer and the subsequent death of their two sons. He published his autobiography My Story in 2004, and in 2005 Brunel University awarded him an honorary Doctorate of Divinity for his service to Christian education.

== Books ==
- The Introvert’s Guide to Spontaneous Witnessing (1983)
- God Wants You Whole (1984)
- Your Personal Encourager (1994)
- If Jesus Were Your Counsellor (August 2000)
- How to Help a Friend (December 2000)
- Christ Empowered Living: Celebrating Your Significance in God (June 2001)
- Can I Really Know Fulfillment (2002)
- Every Day with Jesus Devotionals: The Spirit-Filled Life (September 2003)
- Christ Empowered Living Workbook (January 2004)
- Selwyn Hughes: My Story (February 2004)
- The Pocket Guide for People Helpers (June 2004)
- Stay Spiritually Fresh (Every Day with Jesus Devotional Collection) (July 2004)
- Every Day with Jesus: The Armor of God (July 2004)
- Why Revival Waits (2005)
- Your Personal Encourager: biblical help for dealing with difficult times (January 2005)
- The Seven Laws of Spiritual Success
- Marriage as God Intended (September 2005)
- Discovering Life’s Greatest Purpose
