= List of companies based in Tulsa, Oklahoma =

Companies headquartered in Tulsa, Oklahoma include, but are not limited to, companies in the city's anchoring economic sectors of energy, aerospace, finance, technology, telecommunications, high tech, and manufacturing.

Bloomberg Businessweek ranked Tulsa as having the 7th strongest metro economy, and the 38th best city to live in, in 2012. Area Development called Oklahoma the 10th best state to do business in 2012. The Brookings Institution ranked the city 73rd amongst the world's metropolitan economics for income and employment growth in 2011, and 106th in economic performance worldwide in 2012. It also noted the city for its rising clean (green) industry at 1.7%; Tulsa has the 8th fastest green job growth rate in the country. The city was ranked as being the 26th greenest in the country. MetroMonitor ranked Tulsa 35th in the nation for economic recovery. It was listed as 6th best city for small business and jobs by the Business Journal and Forbes in 2008. In 2012, Tulsa was ranked second for young people to find a job by the Fiscal Times. Engine Advocacy ranked the Tulsa metro as being one of the fastest growing high tech cities in the nation, 2010-2012, and the city was expected to have continuous growth throughout 2013. Tulsa was also ranked as of fifteen cities in the nation for job growth in 2013 by Forbes at 16 percent.

== Large companies ==
This is a list of large or well-known interstate or international companies headquartered in the Tulsa Metropolitan Area.

As of November 2012, Tulsa was home to one Fortune 1000 and two Fortune 500 companies: Dollar Thrifty Automotive Group, energy companies: ONEOK (#219), and The Williams Companies, Inc. (#342).

- QuikTrip - Forbes's Largest Private Companies (30)

== Other companies ==
- AAON
- BOK Financial Corporation, parent company of Bank of Oklahoma, Bank of Texas, Bank of Albuquerque, Bank of Kansas and two others
- Camille's Sidewalk Cafe
- CommunityCare
- FlightSafety International (Simulation Systems Division)
- Flintco
- Hall Estill (law firm with offices across United States)
- Helmerich & Payne
- Lowrance Electronics
- Manhattan Construction Company
- Mazzio's
- Magellan Midstream Partners
- Omni Air International
- ONE Gas
- Oneok
- PennWell Corporation
- QuikTrip
- RibCrib
- Schnake Turnbo Frank
- Scientific Computer Applications
- SemGroup
- Spartan School of Aeronautics
- Stephens Media Group (broadcasting)
- Williams Companies
- United Video Satellite Group, Inc. (A former company between 1978 and 2009)
