= Texas Gas Service =

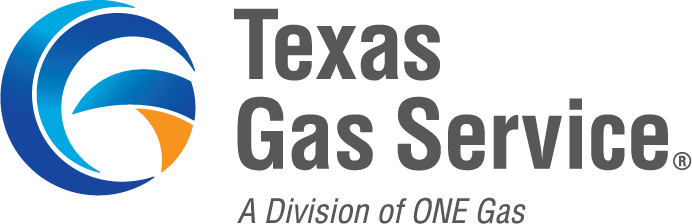
- Company type: Division of ONE Gas
- Industry: Natural gas utility
- Founded: 2003; 23 years ago
- Headquarters: Austin, Texas, United States
- Area served: 100 Texas communities (644,000 customers)
- Key people: Jim Jarrett, Vice President of Operations
- Products: Natural gas distribution
- Number of employees: 800
- Parent: ONE Gas
- Website: Texas Gas Service

Texas Gas Service is the third largest natural gas distribution company in the U.S. state of Texas. It is a regulated public utility that serves more than 884,000 customers in 127 communities, employing 1,000 employees. It operates 10,900 miles of service lines, pipelines and other natural gas distribution properties. Texas Gas Service is a division of ONE Gas, Inc.

== History ==
Texas Gas Service was formed in 2003 when ONEOK purchased the Texas assets of Southern Union Company. Southern Union was created in far-west Texas in 1929 and had since acquired properties in El Paso, Austin, the Rio Grande Valley and other regions of Texas now part of the Texas Gas Service territory. Texas Gas Service has an over 80 year tradition of utility service to customers throughout Texas. ONEOK spun off Texas Gas Service and its two other distribution companies—Oklahoma Natural Gas Company and Kansas Gas Service—to form ONE Gas in February 2014.
