= Kansas Gas Service =

Largest natural gas distribution company in the U.S. state of Kansas

- Company type: Division of ONE Gas
- Industry: Natural gas utility
- Founded: 1997; 29 years ago
- Headquarters: Overland Park, Kansas, United States
- Area served: 342 Kansas communities (634,000 customers)
- Key people: Dennis Okenfuss, Vice President of Operations
- Products: Natural gas distribution
- Number of employees: 1,000
- Parent: ONE Gas
- Website: kansasgasservice.com

Kansas Gas Service is the largest natural gas distribution company in the U.S. state of Kansas, operating in 82 counties. It is a regulated public utility which serves 634,000 customers in 360 communities, employing 1,000 employees. In addition to owning seven interstate pipeline connections and three intrastate pipeline connections, Kansas Gas Service operates 13,500 miles of service lines, pipelines, and other natural gas properties. Headquartered in Overland Park, Kansas, the company was a division of ONEOK Inc., a Tulsa-based Fortune 200 company since 1997 until ONEOK spun off Kansas Gas Service and its two other distribution companies—Oklahoma Natural Gas Company and Texas Gas Service—to form ONE Gas in 2014.

== History ==
Kansas Gas Service was formed in 1997 when ONEOK purchased the natural gas assets of Western Resources (now Evergy). However, it traces its history to the former natural gas subsidiaries of Kansas Gas & Electric and Kansas Power & Light, the two companies that merged to form Western Resources in 1992. At one time, it also served portions of Missouri and Oklahoma. Parts of Kansas Gas Service were joined with the former Missouri Gas Service, together being The Gas Service Company until being purchased by Kansas Power and Light in the late 1980s.

== Operations and service ==
Kansas Gas Service operates extensive natural gas storage facilities, including underground storage in depleted gas reservoirs. The company manages issues related to underground gas migration and property rights, adhering to Kansas state laws such as KSA Section 55-1210. This legislation addresses the ownership and rights associated with injected natural gas, impacting how the company operates its storage facilities and interacts with landowners.

== Safety and risk management ==
Recognizing the potential risks associated with underground natural gas storage, Kansas Gas Service implements rigorous safety protocols to maintain well integrity and prevent gas leaks. The company conducts regular inspections, maintenance, and monitoring of its infrastructure to mitigate risks and comply with regulatory standards.

== Environmental initiatives ==
Kansas Gas Service is involved in efforts to reduce carbon emissions and promote energy efficiency within the state. The company has collaborated with organizations such as the Kansas Department of Transportation (KDOT) to establish carbon emissions baselines for state buildings, aiming to improve sustainability practices and reduce environmental impact.

In the wake of the 2007 tornado that devastated Greensburg, Kansas, Kansas Gas Service contributed to the town's rebuilding efforts by supporting the adoption of alternative fuels and advanced vehicle technologies. This involvement helped promote sustainable energy solutions and environmental resilience in the community.

== Community involvement ==
Kansas Gas Service participates in various community initiatives and educational programs to promote energy safety and conservation. The company provides resources and support for energy assistance programs to help low-income households manage their energy costs.

== See also ==
- ONE Gas
- ONEOK
