= Constance Eirich =

American geologist

Eunice Grace Constance Eirich
- Born: October 14, 1888; Van Wert County, Ohio, USA
- Died: March 3, 1973 (aged 84); Van Wert County, Ohio, USA
- Resting place: Woodland Union Cemetery; Van Wert County, Ohio, USA
- Education: University of Michigan, Ohio Wesleyan University
- Occupation: Tulsa Production Division of Old Gypsy Oil Co.as a subsurface geologist
- Known for: Education and Career as Geologist
- Parent(s): Rev. J. Conrad Eirich and W. Margaret Young

Eunice Grace Constance Eirich (October 14, 1888 – March 3, 1973), known professionally as Constance Eirich, was an American geologist from Van Wert, Ohio.

== Birth and early life ==
Constance Eirich was born on October 14, 1888, in Van Wert, Ohio, to her father, Rev. J. Conrad Eirich, and her mother, W. Margaret Young. Her father was an ordained minister of the Lutheran Church, and served in several areas in Ohio. Constance was one of eight children, though only her and three of her siblings survived into adulthood. Her childhood was spent on a farm outside of Van Wert. She lived there through young adulthood, and attended Van Wert High School.

== Education ==
After graduating from high school in Van Wert, Constance attended Ohio Wesleyan University and attained a bachelor's degree. She went on to complete her graduate studies at the University of Michigan, earning a master's degree. She taught for two years in Michigan and wanted to continue but near the end of World War I, she moved to Tulsa to begin her career in geology as a subsurface geologist. As of September 1, 1918 she identified with the Tulsa Production Division.

== Personal life ==
Eirich was an avid member and leader within her community of Van Wert. Additionally, Constance was the president of District 2 of the Ohio Federation of Women's Clubs. This helped provide safe health facilities for everyone. She also was a contributing member of the National Council of Geography Teachers in May 1917, specifically in the Battle Creek, Michigan section, which was published in the Journal of Geography.

== Career and contributions ==
Constance Eirich was formerly a teacher in Van Wert public schools. After leaving Van Wert she taught for 2 years at Battle Creek, Mich. schools and was considering a position in Kansas City schools when she became interested in the oil industry. She initially volunteered for what was then considered a man's job and was assigned to the Tulsa division of Old Gypsy Oil company as a subsurface geologist.

After working under the Gulf Oil Corporation for 34 years, where she was credited with major work in the findings of four oil pools. Constance was the first woman member of the Tulsa Geological Society and has probably found more oil with subsurface mapping than any other woman. She also became the first women to be acting chief geologist at her company, even though it was considered to be a man's job. She thought it might be only temporary work, but the oil company expanded its operations and the duties filled by Eirich became so vital to the successful operation of geological department of the Gypsy, later the Gulf Oil Corp., that she continued at her desk and laboratory.

== Post career ==
Following her work for the Gulf Oil Corporation, Constance's retirement was announced by the Vice President, P.H Bohart, on October 1, 1952. In announcing the retirement, Bohart also brought attention to the fact that the reports created by Constance had led to the discovery of four new pools. She moved into her previously purchased home at 315 North Jefferson Street upon returning to her native county of Van Wert along with her long-time friend and former classmate Ruth Douglas. She continued to become an active civic leader in her participation as a member of the Van Wert City Council as well as a former president of the Van Wert County Historical Society. Her post-retirement activities also included active membership of St. Mark's Lutheran Church (Van Wert, Ohio, the Van Wert Woman's Club, the Garden Study Club, and the Van Wert County Farm Bureau. Her subsurface geological work for the oil company continued to be used throughout central Oklahoma and eastern Kansas in the following years after playing an essential role in the discovery of the four new oil pools.

At her retirement, she was paid high tribute for her efficiency and faithfulness during her long service with the oil company. Her work for the company extended through central Oklahoma and eastern Kansas during the last several years.

=== Oil pools ===
After Eirich's retirement, it was announced that her contributions had led to the discovery of four oil pools. The first two were the Cheyarha and Garcreek oil pools in Seminole County, Oklahoma, which are now a part of the Earlsboro and North Earlsboro oil fields. These two oil fields are considered to be the two largest ones in Seminole County. The third oil pool Eirich discovered was Rosenwald in Okfuskee County, Oklahoma, which is now believed to be a part of the Morse oil field. The final oil pool she discovered is the East Payson pool in Lincoln County, Oklahoma, which was believed to be one of the first pools of the Oklahoma City Oil Field. This oil field is now the biggest in Oklahoma, and one of the biggest in the world.

== Death ==
Constance died on Saturday March 3, 1973 at the age of 84, unexpectedly in her home. She was predeceased by her parents John Conrad Eirich and W. Margaret Young and her eight siblings. Her obituary was published on March 5 in a local newspaper, stating that, “The Fire Department's emergency squad was summoned to the home by a neighbour, [but that she] was dead upon their arrival,”

=== Legacy ===
Before Eirich's work, participation in Geology had been dominated by men. Constance was one of the first women geologists, and along with that, she was also one of the first to be a leader in the oil field industry. Her work opened the doors for many generations of women who came after her.

After her death, Eirich's will set up scholarship funds at Wittenberg University, Ohio Wesleyan University and the University of Michigan, it also stated that all of her personal property would go to her friend Ruth Douglas. Her will also left the board of directors at Wittenberg University an 80-acre farm section. The sale proceeds of the farm went towards a loan fund known as the Rev. John Conrad and Margaret Eirich Scholarship Loan Fund in memory of her parents. The remainder of the proceeds went to the Van Wert County Foundation, Inc. for a scholarship trust fund for deserving girls pursuing post secondary education.

Constance Eirich's contributions to the field of subsurface geology led to the discovery of four new oil pools, including the biggest field in Oklahoma and one of the biggest around the world.

== See also ==
- Oil in Oklahoma
- Woodland Cemetery
- William K. Warren Sr.
- Women in geology
