= Oil in Oklahoma =

Oil in Oklahoma was first discovered by accident in 1859, in a salt well that had been drilled near Salina, in what was then Indian Territory. In 1907, before Oklahoma became a state, it produced the most oil of any state or territory in the United States. From 1907 to 1930, Oklahoma and California traded the title of number one US oil producer back and forth. Oklahoma oil production peaked in 1927, at 762,000 barrels/day, and by 2005 had declined to 168,000 barrels/day, but then started rising, and by 2014 had more than doubled to 350,000 barrels per day, the fifth highest state in the U.S.

In the latter quarter of the 20th century, an average decline of 3.1%/year, until additional drilling led to a temporary increase from 1980 to 1984, followed by a decline at 6.6%/year until the average decline of 3.1% was met in 1994. As of September 2012, 72 out of the 77 counties in Oklahoma have producing oil or gas wells. The deepest natural gas well is 24,928 feet (7,598 m), in Beckham County, and the deepest producing oil well is 15,500 feet (4,700 m), in Comanche County.

Oil drillers active in Oklahoma include Fred M. Manning. The first female oil operator in Oklahoma, and the first woman to drill a producing oil well on her own property, was Lulu M. Hefner.

== See also ==
- Oil industry in Cushing, Oklahoma
- Oil City, Oklahoma
- Oklahoma City Oil Field
