= 1867 Manhattan, Kansas, earthquake =

Earthquake in Riley County, Kansas, USA

1867 Manhattan earthquake
- Location within Kansas
- UTC time: 1867-04-24
- USGS-ANSS: ComCat
- Local date: April 24, 1867
- Local time: 14:30
- Magnitude: 5.1 M_{fa}
- Epicenter: 39.2°N 96.3°W
- Areas affected: Kansas; United States
- Max. intensity: MMI VII (Very strong)
- Casualties: Several injured

An earthquake struck Riley County, Kansas, in the United States on April 24, 1867, at 20:22 UTC, or about 14:30 local time. The strongest earthquake to originate in the state, it measured 5.1 on a seismic scale that is based on an isoseismal map or the event's felt area. The earthquake's epicenter was near the town of Manhattan.

The earthquake had a maximum perceived intensity of VII (Very strong) on the Mercalli intensity scale. It caused minor damage, reports of which were confined to Kansas, Iowa, and Missouri, according to the United States Geological Survey. Felt over an area of 200,000 square miles (520,000 km^{2}), the earthquake reached the states of Indiana, Illinois, and possibly Ohio, though the latter reports have been questioned.

Manhattan is near the Nemaha Ridge, a long anticline structure that is bounded by several faults. The nearby Humboldt Fault Zone in particular poses a threat to the city. Kansas is not known for earthquake activity, but an earthquake could occur at any time. A 2016 hazard map from the United States Geological Survey estimated a 1% or lower risk for a major earthquake in Kansas for the following year, though scientists from the agency think an earthquake of magnitude 7.0 remains possible.

== Background and geography ==
The Humboldt Fault (red) and Midcontinent Rift System (green) in Kansas and Nebraska

The earthquake's epicenter was near Manhattan, Kansas, a town just off the confluence of the Kansas River and the Big Blue River. Manhattan lies near the Nemaha Ridge, an anticline and 300‑million-year-old Precambrian granite range bounded by faults, which likely produced the earthquake. It hosts the Humboldt Fault Zone, which, in addition to serving as the range's easternmost boundary, has produced a large portion of the state's earthquakes. A normal, or dip-slip fault, it is responsible for at least several small tremors smaller than magnitude 2.7 each year. The fault cuts through Permian rock. Despite being previously thought to be a simple, Precambrian structure, according to the Geological Society of America, it may be a complex fault.

The Nemaha Range lies roughly 50 miles (80 km) east of the Midcontinent rift, which forms a layer of basaltic rock about 1.1 billion years old. This rift extends northward to Lake Superior and the surrounding area and southward to Kansas, then terminates abruptly. Also present in the state is the Central Kansas Uplift, the faults of which produced several small earthquakes during the late 1980s. According to United States Geological Survey geophysicist Don Steeples, earthquakes at the Humboldt Zone have decreased, and activity at the Uplift was increasing as of the 1980s.

Felt over an area of 193,000 square miles (500,000 km^{2}), with other sources listing the felt area as 300,000 square miles (780,000 km^{2}) or 95,000 square miles (250,000 km^{2}), the 1867 earthquake followed the Midcontinent seismic trend: unlike coastal earthquakes in the United States, events in the central and east-central sectors of the country are spread out over extensive areas. This occurs as a result of the region's stiff soil, and because earthquakes in Kansas tend to occur at a shallow depth. The 1867 Manhattan earthquake remains the largest earthquake to originate in the state, though at least 25 have taken place since, including another powerful earthquake 10 miles (16 km) north of Manhattan in Pottawatomie County. In 2016, a magnitude 5.1 earthquake with an epicenter in Oklahoma shook the Manhattan area. According to a report in the Bulletin of the Seismological Society of America, the frequency of moderately strong earthquakes within the state is between 40 and 45 years. One study found that between December 1977 and June 1989, more than 100 earthquakes were recognized by a seismograph network. All were between 4.0 and 0.8 on the Richter scale.

== Damage and casualties ==
Originating at 20:22 UTC, or around 2:30 local time, the earthquake was assigned a maximum Mercalli intensity scale of VII, considered "very strong". Minor damage occurred throughout the geographical region, including 22 counties in Kansas, and injuries were reported as well. The earthquake fractured walls, downed chimneys, and otherwise damaged structures, even loosening stones. Within the epicentral area near Manhattan, clocks stopped, people felt electrical shocks and inhabitants were frightened. The following day, an aftershock occurred between 3 and 4 a.m. Damage within Manhattan and a number of other communities may have been exacerbated by their location within alluvial valleys.

At a farm 3 miles (4.8 km) south of the city of Wamego, the earthquake caused liquefaction of the ground. To the north of Wamego, in the city of Louisville, the earthquake knocked over horses. In both Louisville and the city of Leavenworth, chimneys fell; in Paola, the earthquake destroyed one wall of a large Republican newspaper office building. Waves were observed on the Kansas River, reaching 2.0 feet (0.6 m) in height. The city of Atchison felt two shocks, which felled lamps and bottles at a drug store, rocked buildings, and disrupted water flow in rivers and creeks. Though no buildings in the city sustained damage, people fled into the streets.

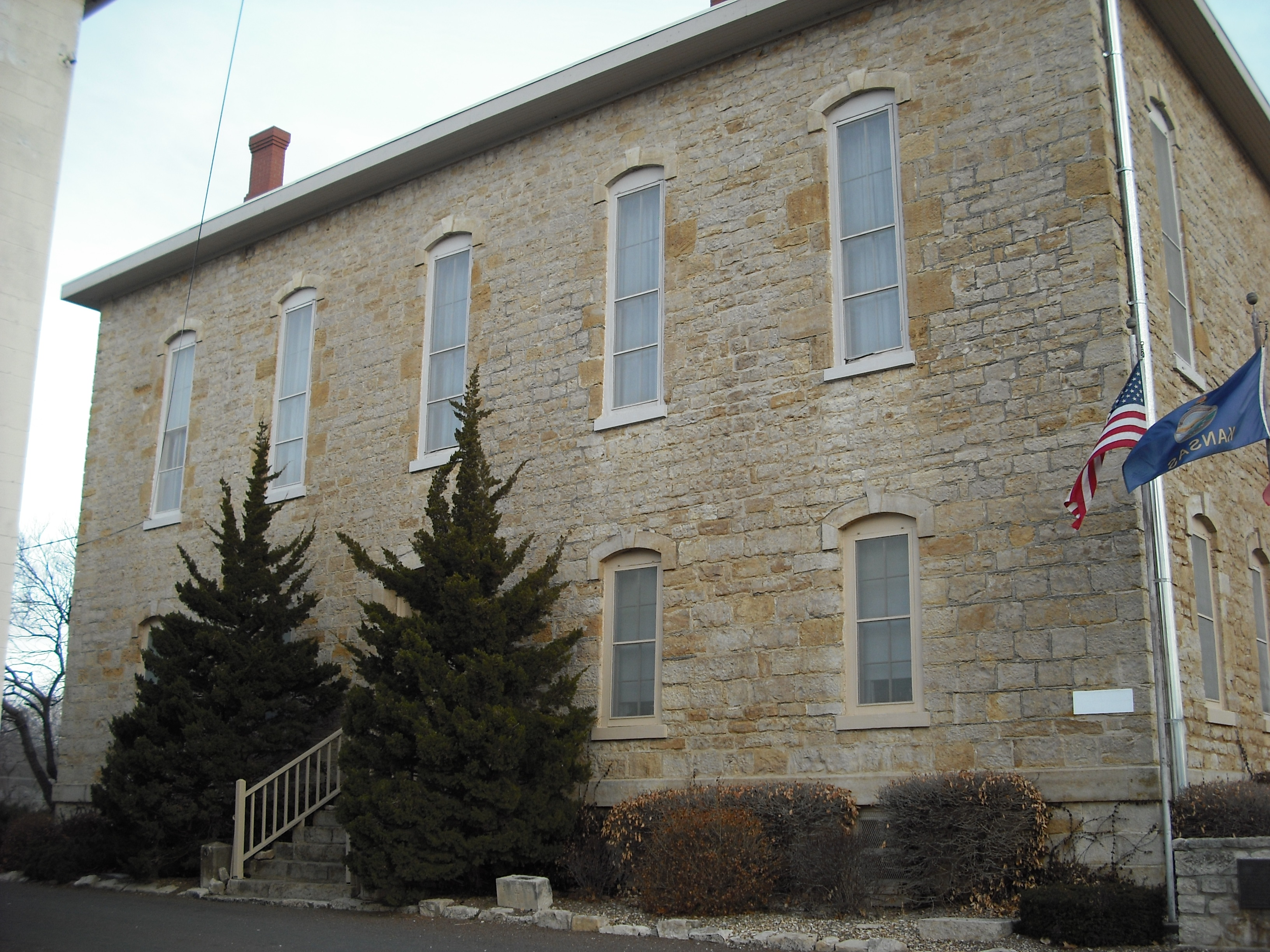
In Lecompton, a building at Lane University (pictured) shook from the earthquake

In Emporia, the earthquake was accompanied by a low rumbling sound, windows rattled, and small boxes were thrown off of shelves as people fled buildings. The city's brick and stone houses sustained more damage than framed homes. The city of Fort Scott only experienced trembling, whereas Iola had houses and tableware shake. In Holton, items were knocked off shelves, and buildings shook. Residents of Irving also heard rumbling prior to the earthquake, experiencing severe tremors that lasted 30 seconds, while buildings in Junction City shook violently, moving several inches. In Kansas City, tables moved, walls cracked, water spilled from glasses, plaster cracked, and the shaking caused general panic.

The city of Lawrence felt three earthquakes within 30 seconds, with violent shaking of doors and windows, broken plaster, a rumbling noise, stones knocked off a local church, rattling of silverware and glassware, and the overturning of a stove in one home. Similarly, in the city of Leavenworth, three shocks were felt over 30 seconds. In Leavenworth, a man was knocked off a hayload, a rumbling noise was heard, and clocks stopped. Moreover, saws leaning against walls were moved 6 inches (15 cm), plaster at one home cracked for the entire length of the house's ceiling, and one woman experienced an electrical shock from spring water. In the city of Lecompton, one of the buildings at Lane University shook, and a high school in the city of Marysville also shook violently.

Within Montgomery County, people in moving vehicles did not feel the earthquake. Houses shook in Mound City, Ottawa, and Olathe, as well as in the city of Oskaloosa, where the cupola (a relatively small, most often dome-like, tall structure) of a new school wobbled. In Paola, people standing were nearly knocked over during the earthquake. A train on the Pacific Railroad in Solomon shook violently, and was stopped and evacuated out of fear that its boiler would explode. In Topeka, the capital city of Kansas, the ceiling of a Methodist church was bent, and nearly all of the windows in one schoolhouse were destroyed. Two shocks were felt in the city of White Cloud, and sleeping people were awakened in Wyandotte County.

Reports from the states of Iowa and Missouri, including descriptions of fallen plaster in Dubuque, shaking of buildings and people in rocking chairs in Des Moines, and fallen and cracked plaster in Chillicothe, complement additional reports of fallen plaster and roof shingles, damaged wells, and cracked walls. Other events reported in Dubuque included three shocks, which caused vibration of gas burners; general panic among residents; rattling of windows; shaking of chairs, cases holding newspapers, and windows; and holes in brick walls. In the city of St. Joseph in Missouri, the windows broke, women fainted, and a rumbling noise could be heard. Within the city, a new school building's brick walls cracked several feet above the ground as people fled into the streets. In Warrensburg, Missouri, the walls of a church shook, but there was no damage. The earthquake also extended into the states of Indiana and Illinois, according to the United States Geological Survey, and a questionable report came from Carthage in Ohio that a segment of the ground, 1 acre (0.40 ha) in area, sunk by 10 feet (3.0 m), forming a perpendicular wall 10-foot (3.0 m) deep on each of its sides.

A series of articles published by the Chicago Tribune describes the extent of the damage throughout the state of Kansas. The article "At Kansas City" details that the earthquake jolted homes with a sudden burst, giving off a resonating roar like thunder. The Tribune observed in its article "At Leavenworth, Kansas" that the earthquake was completely unexpected, describing the event as "[...] sudden in its coming and departure." It confirmed that earthquakes were not common in earlier times and stated that "all were more or less startled, and, indeed, frightened."

== Future threats ==
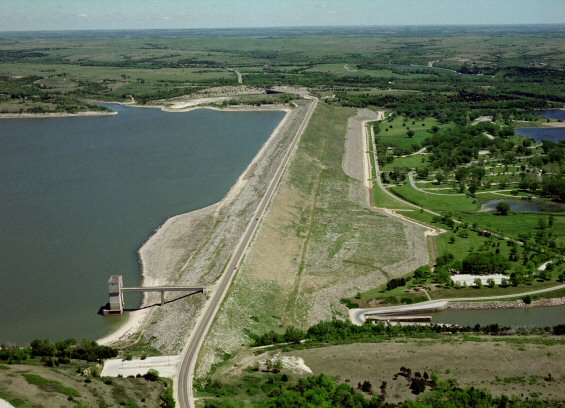
The Tuttle Creek dam and reservoir in Kansas as seen from the west

Although Kansas is not seismically active, a strong earthquake could pose significant threats to the state. If an earthquake were to occur, it would likely be along the Nemaha Ridge, which is still active. The Humboldt Fault Zone, just off the Ridge, lies just 12 miles (19 km) east of the Tuttle Creek Reservoir near Manhattan. An earthquake there would likely destroy the dam, releasing 300,000 feet (91,440 m) of water per second and flooding the nearby area, which would threaten roughly 13,000 people and 5,900 homes. The United States Army Corps of Engineers concluded that a moderate earthquake "between 5.7 and 6.6 would cause sand underneath the dam to liquefy into quicksand, causing the dam to spread out and the top to drop up to three feet." A large earthquake would spawn gaps, forcing water to leak and eventually cause the dam to collapse. Earthquakes that could pose a threat to the dam occur on a cycle of roughly 1,800 years. To counter this threat, the Corps of Engineers has galvanized an effort to strengthen the dam. Replacing the sand (which could shift during an earthquake) with more than 350 walls, the group has equipped the dam with sensors, which are connected to alarms that would alert nearby citizens to the earthquake.

More than 500 earthquakes have been measured in the state since 2013, contributing to the reactivation of ancient fault lines. In 2016, the United States Geological Survey made hazard maps for the state, determining a 1% or lower risk of a major earthquake within the next year. Because Sedgwick County and Wichita could both potentially experience shaking from earthquakes that could not be withstood according to existing building codes, officials in the area proposed changing building codes to meet perceived hazards. Scientists at the United States Geological Survey think an earthquake with a magnitude of 7.0 remains possible, possibly originating from the Nemaha Ridge where the Manhattan quake was produced.

== See also ==
- List of earthquakes in the United States
- List of historical earthquakes

== Sources ==
- DuBois, S. M.; Wilson, F. W. (1978). A Revised and Augmented List of Earthquake Intensities for Kansas, 1867–1977 (PDF). Kansas Geological Survey.
- Merriam, D. F. (April 1956). "History of earthquakes in Kansas". Bulletin of the Seismological Society of America. 46 (2). Seismological Society of America: 87. Bibcode:1956BuSSA..46...87M. doi:10.1785/BSSA0460020087.
- Steeples, D. W.; DuBois, S. M. & Wilson, F. W. (March 1979). "Seismicity, faulting, and geophysical anomalies in Nemaha County, Kansas: Relationship to regional structures". Geology. 7 (3). Geological Society of America: 134–138. Bibcode:1979Geo.....7..134S. doi:10.1130/0091-7613(1979)7<134:SFAGAI>2.0.CO;2.
- Stover, C. W.; Coffman, J. L. (1993). Seismicity of the United States, 1568–1989 (Revised): U.S. Geological Survey Professional Paper 1527. United States Government Printing Office.
- Wasowski, J.; Giordan, D.; Lollino, P. (2017). Engineering Geology and Geological Engineering for Sustainable Use of the Earth's Resources, Urbanization and Infrastructure Protection from Geohazards: Proceedings of the 1st GeoMEast International Congress and Exhibition, Egypt 2017 on Sustainable Civil Infrastructures. Springer Publishing.
