= Canton, Kansas =

City in McPherson County, Kansas

- City
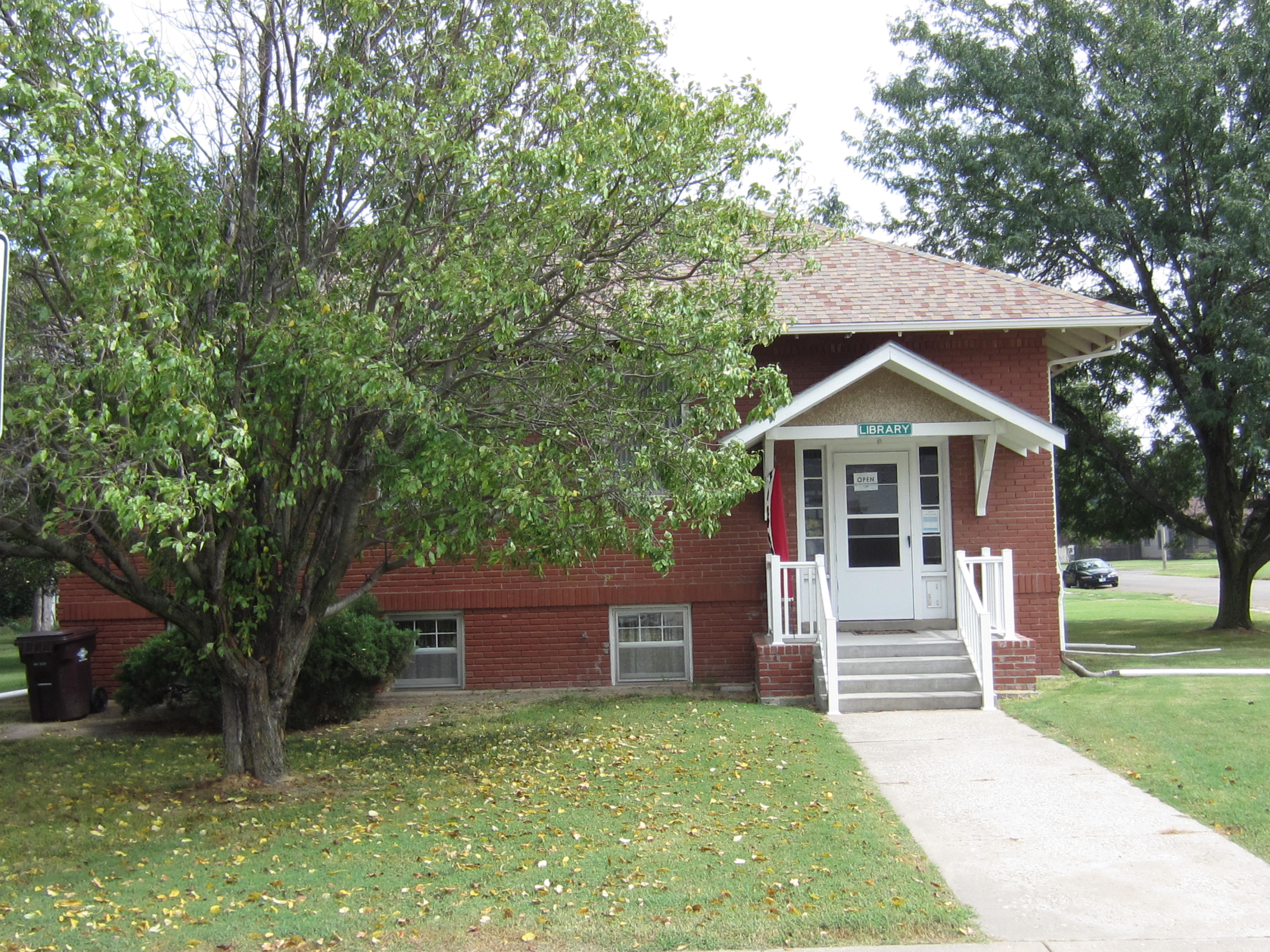
- Canton Township Carnegie Library (2013)

- Location within McPherson County and Kansas

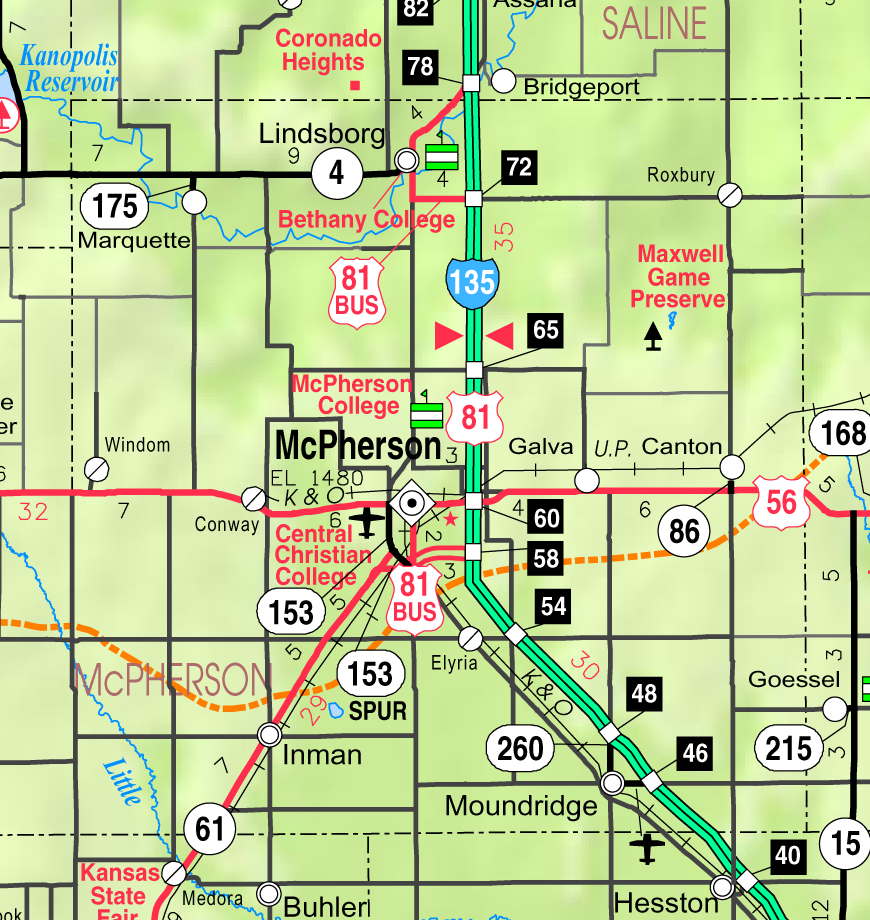
- KDOT map of McPherson County (legend)
- Coordinates: 38°23′09″N 97°25′48″W
- Country: United States
- State: Kansas
- County: McPherson
- Founded: 1870s
- Platted: 1879
- Incorporated: 1880
- Named for: Canton, Ohio

Government
  - Type: Mayor–Council
  - Mayor: Earl Maltbie

Area
  - Total: 0.50 sq mi (1.29 km^{2})
  - Land: 0.50 sq mi (1.29 km^{2})
  - Water: 0 sq mi (0.00 km^{2})
- Elevation: 1,591 ft (485 m)

Population (2020)
  - Total: 685
  - Density: 1,380/sq mi (531/km^{2})
- Time zone: UTC-6 (CST)
  - Summer (DST): UTC-5 (CDT)
- ZIP Code: 67428
- Area code: 620
- FIPS code: 20-10475
- GNIS ID: 2393735
- Website: cantonks.org

Canton is a city in McPherson County, Kansas, United States. As of the 2020 census, the population of the city was 685. It is named after Canton, Ohio.

== History ==
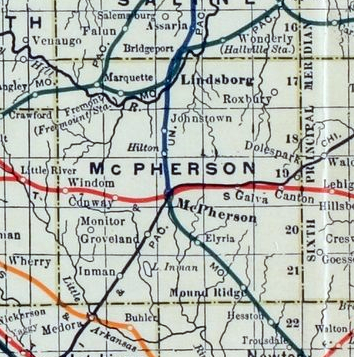
1915 railroad map of McPherson County

=== Early history ===
For many millennia, the Great Plains of North America was inhabited by nomadic Native Americans. From the 16th century to 18th century, the Kingdom of France claimed ownership of large parts of North America. In 1762, after the French and Indian War, France secretly ceded New France to Spain, per the Treaty of Fontainebleau.

=== 19th century ===
In 1802, Spain returned most of the land to France. In 1803, most of the land for modern day Kansas was acquired by the United States from France as part of the 828,000 square mile Louisiana Purchase for 2.83 cents per acre.

From the 1820s to the 1870s, one of the most significant land routes in the United States was the Santa Fe Trail. It was located southeast of Canton. Two DAR markers were located on the trail near Canton, one at the Jones Cemetery east of Canton, and another south of Canton. The trail was active across McPherson County from 1821 to 1866.

In 1854, the Kansas Territory was organized, then in 1861 Kansas became the 34th U.S. state. In 1867, McPherson County was established within the Kansas Territory, which included the land for modern day Canton.

As early as 1875, city leaders of Marion held a meeting to consider a branch railroad from Florence. In 1878, Atchison, Topeka and Santa Fe Railway and parties from Marion and McPherson counties chartered the Marion and McPherson Railway Company. In 1879, a branch line was built from Florence to McPherson; in 1880 it was extended to Lyons and in 1881 was extended to Ellinwood. The line was leased and operated by the Atchison, Topeka and Santa Fe Railway. The line from Florence to Marion was abandoned in 1968. In 1992, the line from Marion to McPherson was sold to Central Kansas Railway. In 1993, after heavy flood damage, the line from Marion through Canton to McPherson was abandoned and removed. The original branch line connected Florence, Marion, Canada, Hillsboro, Lehigh, Canton, Galva, McPherson, Conway, Windom, Little River, Mitchell, Lyons, Chase and Ellinwood.

After the railroad was built through the area in 1879, a village was established that grew to over 300 inhabitants, then was incorporated as a city in 1880 and named after Canton, Ohio because an early settler came from Ohio.

In 1887, the Chicago, Kansas and Nebraska Railway built a main line from Herington through Canton to Pratt. In 1888, this line was extended to Liberal. Later, it was extended to Tucumcari, New Mexico and El Paso, Texas. It foreclosed in 1891 and taken over by Chicago, Rock Island and Pacific Railway, which shut down in 1980 and reorganized as Oklahoma, Kansas and Texas Railroad, merged in 1988 with Missouri Pacific Railroad, merged in 1997 with Union Pacific Railroad. Most locals still refer to this railroad as the "Rock Island".

== Geography ==
According to the United States Census Bureau, the city has a total area of 0.50 square miles (1.29 km^{2}), all land.

== Area attractions ==
- Canton is the site of the McPherson County Fairgrounds. The McPherson County Fair has been held in Canton since 1948.
- Six miles north of Canton on 27th Avenue and one half-mile west on Pueblo Rd is the Maxwell Wildlife Refuge. In fact, Canton has been identified as the "Gateway to Maxwell Wildlife Refuge." This section of land is preserved natural prairie, comprising rolling hills, creeks, springs, and beautiful prairie grasses and wildflowers. Here 200 head of bison and 50 elk roam free. It was established in 1859 by John Gault Maxwell to allow future generations to experience Kansas as it was in the 1800s, prior to settlement. This 2,574 acres (10.42 km^{2}) refuge is owned and managed by the Kansas Department of Wildlife and Parks.
- Canton has two water towers, labeled "HOT" (in red) and "COLD" (in blue). The words were painted on as a tourist attraction in 1956 at the suggestion of local real estate agent Mrs. M.D. Fisher. In fact, both tanks hold water at an ambient temperature.

== Demographics ==
Historical population
Census	Pop.	Note	%±
1880	396		—
1890	420		6.1%
1900	493		17.4%
1910	684		38.7%
1920	700		2.3%
1930	728		4.0%
1940	796		9.3%
1950	771		−3.1%
1960	784		1.7%
1970	893		13.9%
1980	926		3.7%
1990	794		−14.3%
2000	829		4.4%
2010	748		−9.8%
2020	685		−8.4%
U.S. Decennial Census

=== 2020 census ===
The 2020 United States census counted 685 people, 283 households, and 185 families in Canton. The population density was 1,378.3 per square mile (532.2/km^{2}). There were 316 housing units at an average density of 635.8 per square mile (245.5/km^{2}). The racial makeup was 95.04% (651) white or European American (93.58% non-Hispanic white), 1.02% (7) black or African-American, 0.44% (3) Native American or Alaska Native, 0.15% (1) Asian, 0.0% (0) Pacific Islander or Native Hawaiian, 0.15% (1) from other races, and 3.21% (22) from two or more races. Hispanic or Latino of any race was 2.19% (15) of the population.

Of the 283 households, 30.4% had children under the age of 18; 47.3% were married couples living together; 20.8% had a female householder with no spouse or partner present. 29.3% of households consisted of individuals and 14.5% had someone living alone who was 65 years of age or older. The average household size was 2.5 and the average family size was 2.9. The percent of those with a bachelor's degree or higher was estimated to be 12.4% of the population.

24.2% of the population was under the age of 18, 8.0% from 18 to 24, 25.7% from 25 to 44, 25.7% from 45 to 64, and 16.4% who were 65 years of age or older. The median age was 37.4 years. For every 100 females, there were 96.3 males. For every 100 females ages 18 and older, there were 92.9 males.

The 2016–2020 5-year American Community Survey estimates show that the median household income was $56,875 (with a margin of error of +/- $8,122) and the median family income was $65,268 (+/- $13,079). Males had a median income of $28,643 (+/- $5,612) versus $26,296 (+/- $2,299) for females. The median income for those above 16 years old was $27,097 (+/- $2,476). Approximately, 0.0% of families and 5.9% of the population were below the poverty line, including 0.0% of those under the age of 18 and 2.8% of those ages 65 or over.

=== 2010 census ===
As of the census of 2010, there were 748 people, 301 households, and 205 families residing in the city. The population density was 1,496.0 inhabitants per square mile (577.6/km^{2}). There were 336 housing units at an average density of 672.0 per square mile (259.5/km^{2}). The racial makeup of the city was 96.9% White, 0.4% African American, 0.1% Native American, 0.1% Asian, 0.3% Pacific Islander, 0.3% from other races, and 1.9% from two or more races. Hispanic or Latino of any race were 1.9% of the population.

There were 301 households, of which 33.6% had children under the age of 18 living with them, 55.8% were married couples living together, 10.3% had a female householder with no husband present, 2.0% had a male householder with no wife present, and 31.9% were non-families. 25.9% of all households were made up of individuals, and 10.3% had someone living alone who was 65 years of age or older. The average household size was 2.49 and the average family size was 2.96.

The median age in the city was 37.9 years. 25.3% of residents were under the age of 18; 6.1% were between the ages of 18 and 24; 26.3% were from 25 to 44; 25.8% were from 45 to 64; and 16.4% were 65 years of age or older. The gender makeup of the city was 46.8% male and 53.2% female.

=== 2000 census ===
As of the census of 2000, there were 829 people, 315 households, and 230 families residing in the city. The population density was 1,669.0 inhabitants per square mile (644.4/km^{2}). There were 342 housing units at an average density of 688.5 per square mile (265.8/km^{2}). The racial makeup of the city was 97.71% White, 0.24% African American (two people), 0.12% Native American, 0.36% Asian (three people), 0.12% Pacific Islander (1 Native Hawaiian), and 1.45% from two or more races. Hispanic or Latino of any race were 0.72% of the population.

There were 315 households, out of which 34.0% had children under the age of 18 living with them, 62.9% were married couples living together, 5.7% had a female householder with no husband present, and 26.7% were non-families. 24.4% of all households were made up of individuals, and 11.4% had someone living alone who was 65 years of age or older. The average household size was 2.48 and the average family size was 2.94.

In the city, the population was spread out, with 24.8% under the age of 18, 8.3% from 18 to 24, 25.3% from 25 to 44, 21.5% from 45 to 64, and 20.0% who were 65 years of age or older. The median age was 39 years. For every 100 females, there were 90.1 males. For every 100 females age 18 and over, there were 88.2 males.

The median income for a household in the city was $34,808, and the median income for a family was $45,357. Males had a median income of $30,556 versus $20,588 for females. The per capita income for the city was $16,428. About 4.2% of families and 4.8% of the population were below the poverty line, including 6.2% of those under age 18 and 3.3% of those age 65 or over.

== Government ==
The Canton consists of a mayor and five council members. The council meets once a month.

- City Hall, 100 South Main St.

== Education ==
The community is served by Canton-Galva USD 419 public school district. This school district includes:

- Canton-Galva Elementary School, located in Canton
- Canton-Galva Middle School, located in Galva
- Canton-Galva High School, located in Canton

Canton and Galva schools unified in 1972 forming Canton-Galva High School with the Eagles mascot. Prior to unification, the Canton High School mascot was Canton Tigers.

== Media ==
=== Print ===
- Hillsboro Free Press, free newspaper for greater Marion County area.
- McPherson Sentinel, regional newspaper from McPherson.
- The Salina Journal, regional newspaper from Salina.

== Infrastructure ==
=== Utilities ===
- Internet
  - Wireless is provided by Pixius Communications.
  - Satellite is provided by HughesNet, StarBand, WildBlue.
- TV
  - Satellite is provided by DirecTV, Dish Network.
  - Terrestrial is provided by regional digital TV stations.
- Electricity
  - City is provided by Westar Energy.
- Gas
  - Service is provided by Kansas Gas Service.
- Water
  - City is provided by City of Canton.
  - Rural is provided by Marion County RWD #4.
- Sewer
  - Service is provided by City of Canton.
- Trash
  - Service is provided by McPherson Area Solid Waste Utility.

== Popular culture ==
On July 21, 2008, Stephen Colbert made a comment on The Colbert Report about John McCain making a campaign stop in Canton, Ohio, and "not the crappy Canton in Georgia." The comment resulted in a local uproar, which prompted Stephen to apologize for the story during his July 30, 2008, show, insisting that he was incorrect and that the "real" crappy Canton was Canton, Kansas, after which he made several jokes at the town's expense. Reaction from Mayor Brad Smiley and local residents was negative and Kansas governor Kathleen Sebelius invited Colbert to "spend a night" in Canton's historic jail. On August 5, 2008, Colbert apologized to citizens of Canton, Kansas, then continued the running gag by directing his mock derision in successive weeks towards Canton, South Dakota and Canton, Texas. On October 28, Colbert turned his attention back to Canton, Ohio after Barack Obama made a campaign stop there, forcing Colbert to find it "crappy".

== See also ==
- List of people from McPherson County, Kansas
- Santa Fe Trail
- National Register of Historic Places listings in McPherson County, Kansas
  - Canton Township Carnegie Library
  - Heinrich H. Schroeder Barn
