= SCAI =

SCAI may refer to:

- Specialty Coffee Association of Indonesia
- Scientific Computer Applications Inc.
- SCAI, the Fraunhofer-Institute for Algorithms and Scientific Computing, see Fraunhofer Society#Institutes
