= Midwestern Gas Transmission =

Midwestern Gas Transmission is a natural gas pipeline which takes natural gas from the Chicago area and brings it down into the Ohio River Valley, although it has occasionally flowed in the opposite direction. It is owned by ONEOK. Its FERC code is 5.
