= Harold DeMarsh =

American collegiate wrestler (1902–1982)

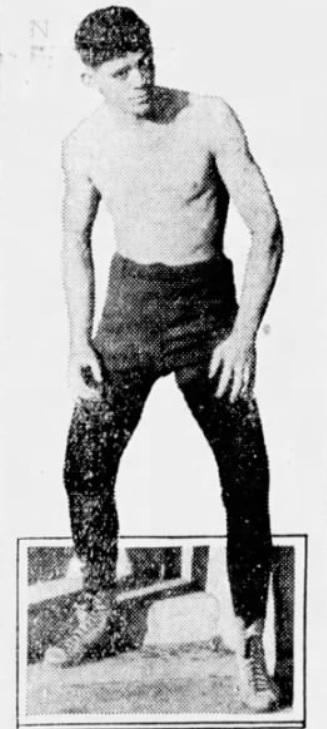

Personal information
- Born: March 9, 1902 Menominee, Michigan, U.S.
- Died: March 25, 1982 (aged 80) Del City, Oklahoma, U.S.
- Home town: Cushing, Oklahoma, U.S.

Sport
- Sport: Wrestling
- Event: Folkstyle
- College team: Oklahoma A&M
- Coached by: Edward C. Gallagher
Medal record
Collegiate Wrestling
Representing Oklahoma A&M
NCAA Championships
| Gold medal – first place | 1928 Ames | 115 lb |

Harold DeMarsh (March 9, 1902 – March 25, 1982) was an American folkstyle wrestler. He was the first wrestler to become an NCAA wrestling champion. DeMarsh competed at the 115-pound weight class and won the first NCAA individual wrestling title at the 1928 NCAA Wrestling Championships.

== Personal life and death ==
The son of Joseph and Ruby DeMarsh, Harold DeMarsh was born on March 9, 1902 in Menominee, Michigan. He attended high school in Cushing, Oklahoma, where he became a National Amateur Athletic Union (AAU) champion in 1925. DeMarsh moved to Oklahoma City upon graduating from Oklahoma A&M in 1928. He had a wife, three children, 13 grandchildren, and 10 great-grandchildren. He had a career as a photographer. He died on March 25, 1982, at the age of 80 due to an illness.

== Wrestling career ==
While attending Oklahoma A&M, DeMarsh competed as part of the Oklahoma A&M Aggies, under head coach Edward C. Gallagher. He tried to be part of the 125-pound class multiple times, but failed each time. DeMarsh was second at the AAU national contest in 1926 and in third in 1927, both in the 115-pound class.

In 1928, DeMarsh tried out for the Oklahoma A&M Aggies wrestling team again in the 125-pound class due to gaining weight. However, he would end up dropping down a weight and joined the team at the 115-pound class. He competed at 115 pounds at the first annual 1928 NCAA Wrestling Championships. He became the first NCAA wrestling champion in history by defeating Harold Higgins from Iowa State University due to three minutes and ten seconds of time advantage. There were other champions from other weight classes, but their matches were after DeMarsh's 115-pound NCAA Championship match, thus making him the first NCAA wrestling champion. The other weight classes were 125-pound, 135-pound, 145-pound, 158-pound, and 175-pounds. Higgins said in 1979, "I lost a 21-minute match at 115 pounds to Harold DeMarsh. After we were all even on riding time after the first 15 minutes, we went another six minutes of overtime."

After wrestling at Oklahoma A&M, DeMarsh taught wrestling at his local YMCA before and throughout World War II, with his teams winning several amateur wrestling state championships. He also taught judo and karate as part of the United States Navy at Naval Station Great Lakes. DeMarsh's NCAA championship medal and AAU medals were lost due to a fire. His son, Gerald DeMarsh, had replicas of the medals that he showed to the National Wrestling Hall of Fame and Museum in Stillwater, Oklahoma, which holds a display of his 1928 championship match.
