= Heinrich H. Schroeder Barn =

- Schroeder, Heinrich H., Barn
- U.S. National Register of Historic Places
- Location within Kansas Location within the United States
- Location: 632 29th Ave., Canton, Kansas
- Coordinates: 38°16′3″N 97°23′18″W
- Area: less than one acre
- Built: 1915
- Architect: Schroeder, Heinrich H.
- NRHP reference No.: 05001051
- Added to NRHP: September 21, 2005

The Heinrich H. Schroeder Barn is a historic barn at 632 29th Avenue in Canton, Kansas, United States. It was built in 1915 and added to the National Register of Historic Places in 2005.

It is a two-story barn which is 73 by 32 feet (22.3 m × 9.8 m) in plan, with a gable roof featuring a hay hood over its front gable. The barn once had two cupolas, but those were lost in a 1946 tornado.

It was built by Heinrich H. Schroeder, a Mennonite born in Russia.
