= Cushing Municipal Airport =

Airport in Oklahoma, United States

- IATA: CUH; ICAO: KCUH; FAA LID: CUH

Summary
- Airport type: Public
- Owner: City of Cushing
- Serves: Cushing, Oklahoma
- Elevation AMSL: 925 ft (282 m)
- Coordinates: 35°57′00″N 096°46′24″W

Map
- Location within Oklahoma Location within the United States

Runways
Direction	Length		Surface
Direction	ft	m	Surface
18/36	5,201	1,585	Concrete
2/20	2,650	808	Turf
8/26	2,700	823	Turf
11/29	2,500	762	Turf

Statistics (2011)
- Aircraft operations: 2,500
- Based aircraft: 16
- Source: Federal Aviation Administration

Cushing Municipal Airport (IATA: CUH, ICAO: KCUH, FAA LID: CUH) is two miles south of Cushing, in Payne County, Oklahoma. The National Plan of Integrated Airport Systems for 2021-2025 categorized it as a general aviation airport.

== Facilities ==
The airport covers 672 acres (272 ha) at an elevation of 925 feet (282 m). Runway 18/36 is concrete, 5,201 by 100 feet (1,585 x 30 m); three runways are grass: 2/20 is 2,650 by 60 feet (808 x 18 m), 8/26 is 2,700 by 40 feet (823 x 12 m), and 11/29 is 2,500 by 50 feet (762 x 15 m).

In the year ending September 23, 2011 the airport had 2,500 general aviation aircraft operations, average 208 per month. 16 aircraft were then based at this airport: 88% single-engine, 6% jet, and 6% helicopter.

== See also ==
- List of airports in Oklahoma
