= Oklahoma Natural Gas Company Building =

- Oklahoma Natural Gas Company Building aka The 624 Boston Building
- U.S. National Register of Historic Places
- U.S. Historic district – Contributing property
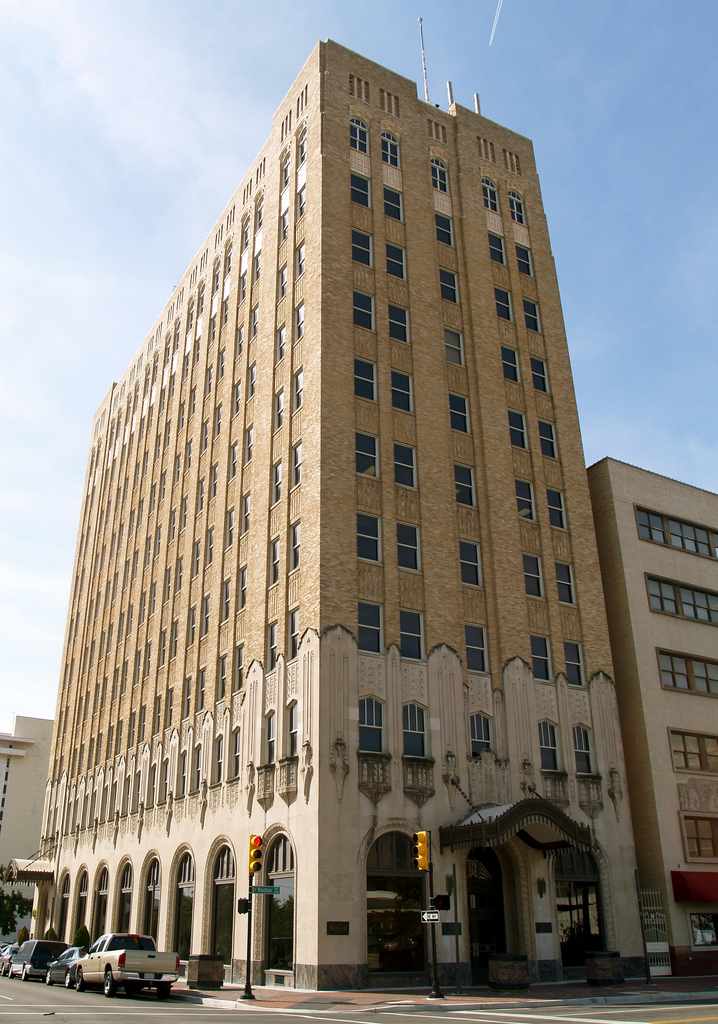
- Oklahoma Natural Gas Company Building
- Location: Tulsa, OK
- Coordinates: 36°09′00″N 95°59′18″W
- Built: 1925; 101 years ago
- Architect: Kirshner, Frank V.; Atkinson, Arthur M.
- Architectural style: Art Deco
- NRHP reference No.: 84003458
- Added to NRHP: April 10, 1984; 42 years ago

The Oklahoma Natural Gas Company Building is a historic building in Tulsa, Oklahoma, at 624 South Boston Ave. It was one of the first local Art Deco buildings built in the new style, along with the Public Service of Oklahoma Building. This choice by the relatively conservative utility companies made the style acceptable in the city, with many Art Deco buildings built subsequently in Tulsa. The building was designed by Frank V. Kirshner and Arthur M. Atkinson. It was built of reinforced concrete, and clad in buff brick, except for the lower two stories, which are clad in limestone. The verticalness of the building is emphasized by piers rising the entire height of the facade with windows placed between the piers.

This building was spared from demolition in 1982, when ONEOK (the successor to ONG) abandoned its plan to replace the structure with a new high-rise headquarters building. Instead, ONEOK took over a high-rise then under construction by Citgo at Fifth Street and Boulder Avenue. The building was listed on the National Register of Historic Places on April 10, 1984, for architectural significance and as a representative of the tremendous growth Tulsa experienced during the 1920s. It is included in the Oil Capital Historic District as a contributing structure.
