= AAON =

HVAC manufacturing company

AAON, Inc.
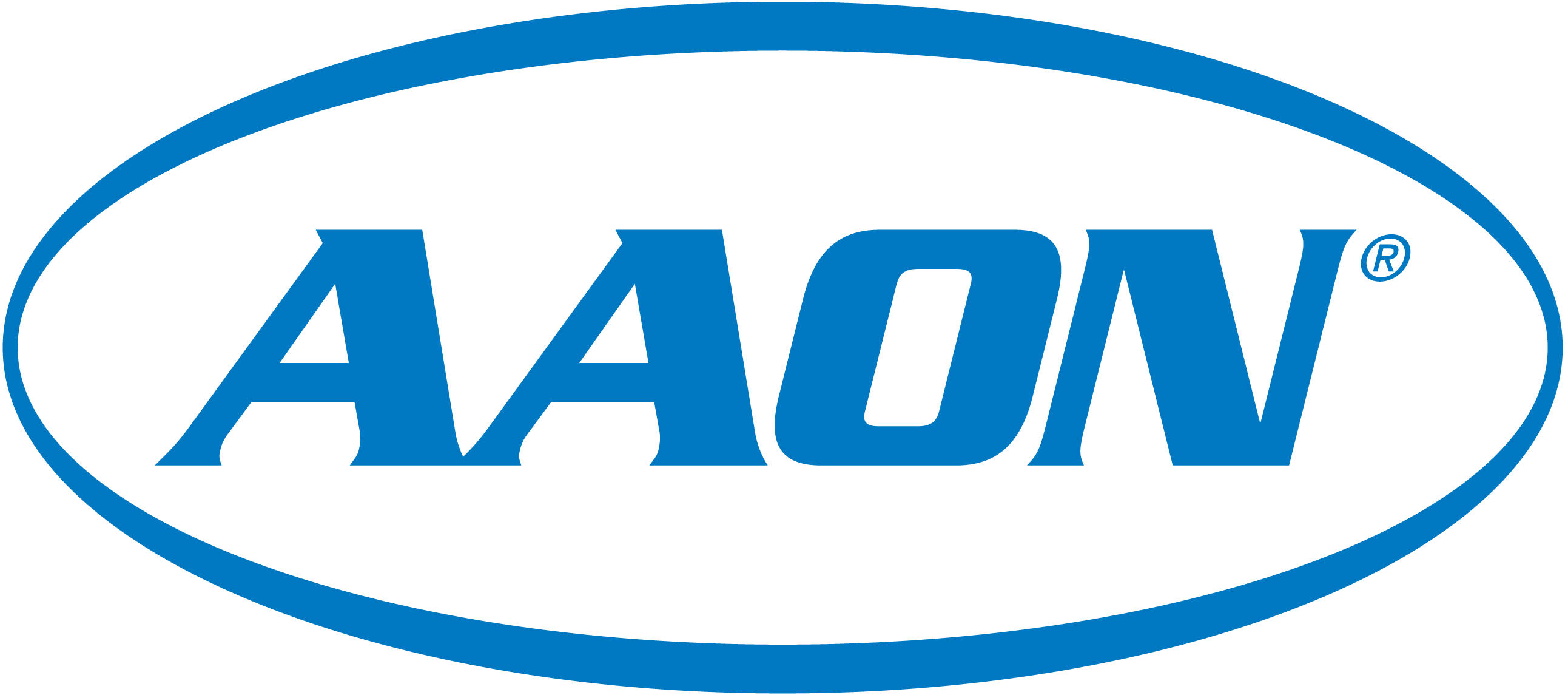
- Company type: Public
- Traded as: Nasdaq: AAON; S&P 400 component
- Industry: Heating, Ventilating and Air Conditioning (HVAC)
- Founded: 1988; 37 years ago
- Headquarters: Tulsa, Oklahoma, U.S.
- Number of employees: 3,856 (February 2024)
- Website: aaon.com

AAON, Inc. manufactures heating, ventilation, and air conditioning equipment for commercial and industrial indoor environments. AAON is headquartered in Tulsa, Oklahoma and has manufacturing facilities in Longview, TX, Parkville, MO, and Redmond, OR. AAON employs approximately 4,000 people worldwide and has annual sales in excess of $880 million.

== History ==
AAON was founded in 1988 when Norman H. Asbjornson set out to create a commercial HVAC company that designed and manufactured semi-custom equipment. Asbjornson purchased the heating and air-conditioning division of John Zink and created a new company called AAON. The name ensured the company would be listed first in the phone directories.

In 2000, AAON began to manufacture equipment in Longview and in 2019, broke ground on a facility expansion as part of a $28-million-dollar investment in the plant. Further expansion in Longview commenced in 2019 with the completion of a 220,000-square foot building, an additional $40 million investment. In 2023, the Longview Economic Development Corp. approved a second $40 million expansion and is scheduled to be completed in 2024.

== Acquisitions ==
In 1991, AAON acquired Coils Plus in Longview, TX, initially only committed to manufacturing HVAC coils.

In 2018, AAON acquired Missouri-based WattMaster Controls (WCI) and entered a lease of the facility previously occupied by WCI.

In 2021, AAON acquired Oregon-based BASX Solutions (BASX). BASX designs and manufactures premium, highly customized commercial HVAC equipment for data centers, clean rooms, and other niche applications.

== See also ==
- List of companies based in Tulsa, Oklahoma
- List of S&P 400 companies
