= Oil industry in Cushing, Oklahoma =

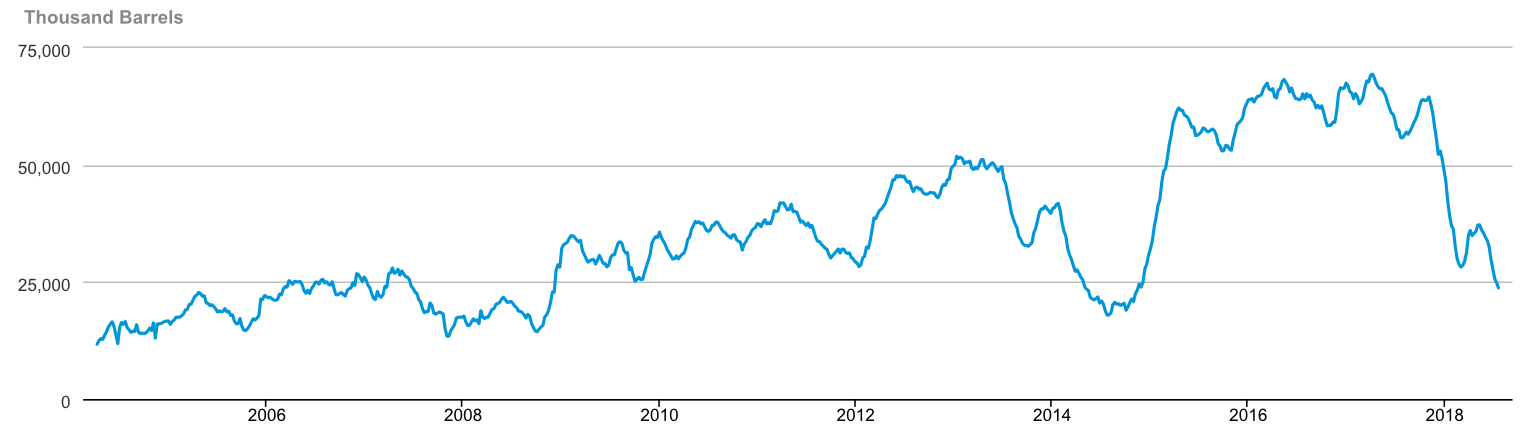
Graph of weekly Cushing Stocks excluding SPR of Crude Oil from 2004 to 2018

The city of Cushing in Oklahoma is a central hub within the United States and worldwide oil industry. It connects major pipelines within the United States and is the location where the oil futures contracts end up being delivered. It is the physical delivery point of West Texas Intermediate oil.

== Operators ==
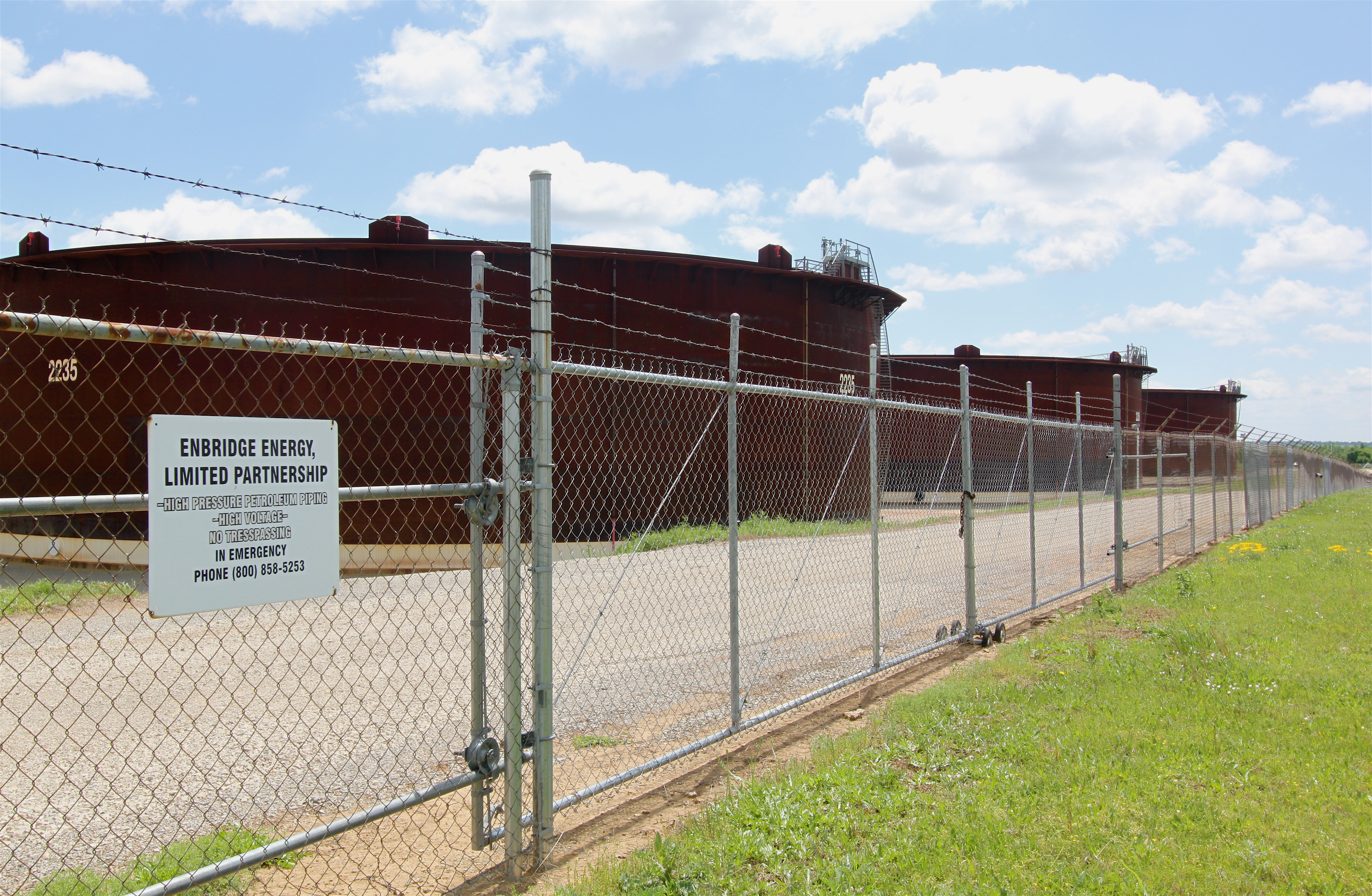
Enbridge crude oil tank farm has a maximum storage capacity of 20,060,000 barrels (3,189,000 m^{3}) (2010)

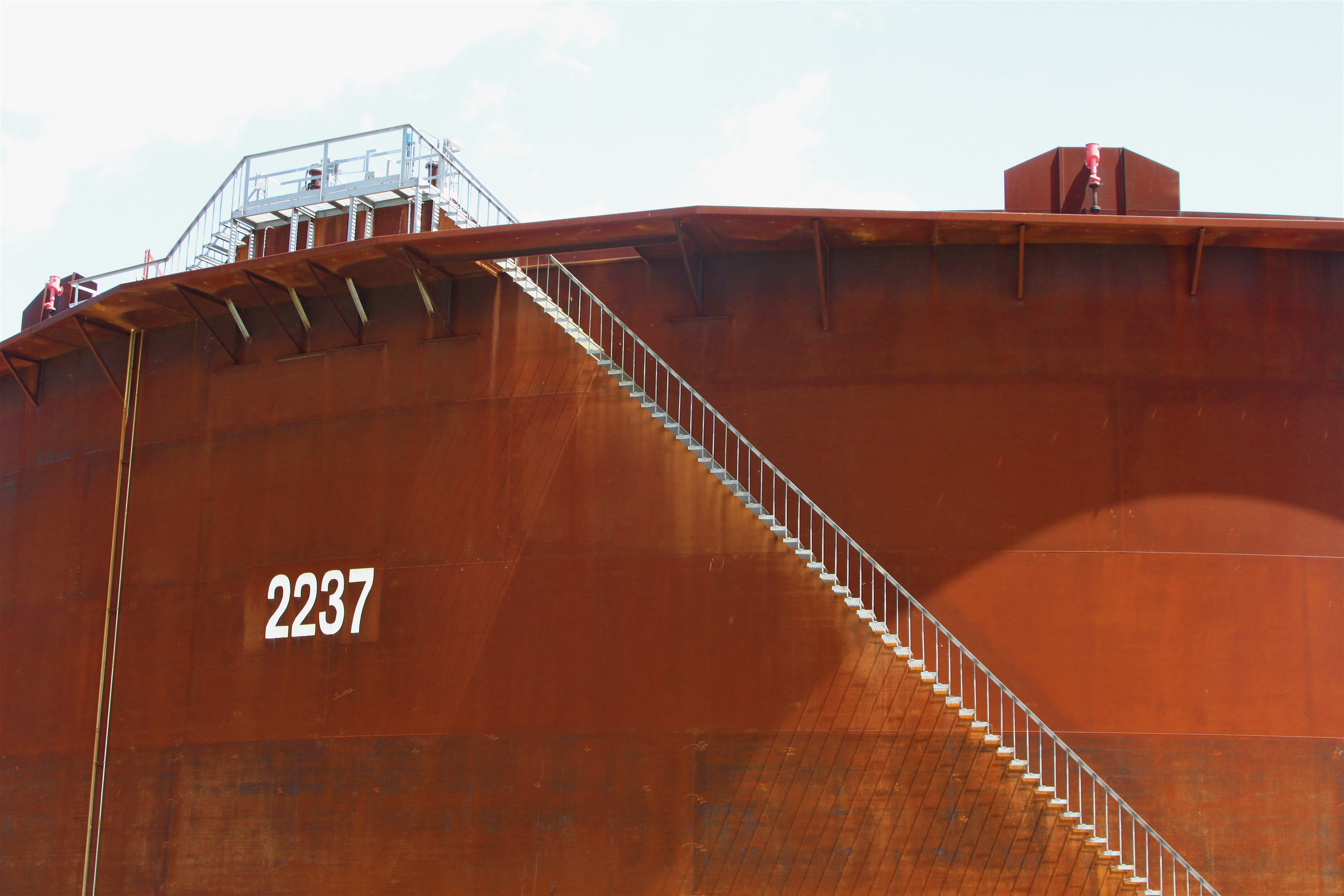
The stairs give a relative perspective of the size of the massive storage tanks in Cushing

Cushing serves as a transshipment point for gathering crude oil from all directions. Dozens of pipelines converge around the city, which offers storage facilities to temporarily hold crude awaiting delivery to refiners or other outlets. In 2005, crude oil and refined products in the US were almost always transported by interconnected pipeline systems. In Oklahoma, eight private companies operated almost all the pipelines and frequently operated oil terminals and refineries: Enbridge; Enterprise Products; Explorer Pipeline; Jayhawk; Magellan Midstream Partners; Plains All American Pipeline; Sunoco; and Valero Energy.

The crude oil tanks around Cushing have approximately 91 million barrels of storage capacity. On October 28, 2016, tanks held a total of 58.5 million barrels of oil, though it has dropped in 2018.

Tank farm owners at Cushing include:

- Magellan Midstream Partners, 7,800,000 barrels (1,240,000 m^{3}) of storage, formerly owned by BP.
- Enbridge Energy Partners, 20,060,000 barrels (3,189,000 m^{3}) of storage.
- Enterprise Products, 3,100,000 barrels (490,000 m^{3}) of storage.
- JP Energy Partners LP, 3,000,000 barrels (480,000 m^{3}) of storage.
- Plains All American Pipeline, 20,000,000 barrels (3,200,000 m^{3}) of storage.
- Energy Transfer LP, 7,600,000 barrels (1,210,000 m^{3}) of storage at Rose Rock Midstream Cushing terminal.

Pipelines with connections at Cushing include:

- Basin Oil Pipeline, operated by Plains All American Pipeline, flows from Wichita Falls, Texas connecting various fields in Texas.
- Centurion Pipeline, flows from Permian Basin fields in west Texas and southeast New Mexico.
- Hawthorn Pipeline, operated by Hawthorn Oil Transportation, a 17-mile pipeline from Stroud, Oklahoma where a rail unloading facility receives oil from Stanley, North Dakota for EOG Resources.
- Glass Mountain Pipeline, operated by Rose Rock Midstream (Energy Transfer LP), flows from fields in west and north-central Oklahoma.
- Great Salt Plains Pipeline, operated by JP Energy, flows from fields around Cherokee, Oklahoma, formerly owned by Parnon Gathering.
- Keystone Pipeline, operated by TransCanada, flows from Hardisty, Alberta (Canada) to an intermediary hub in Cushing to Port Arthur, Texas. It has a maximum capacity of 590,000 barrels per day (94,000 m^{3}/d). Another Keystone termination is located at the oil tank farm near Patoka, Illinois.
- Mississippian Lime Pipeline, operated by Plains All American Pipeline, flows from fields in northern Oklahoma and southern Kansas.
- PAA Medford Pipeline, operated by Plains All American Pipeline, from fields around Medford, Oklahoma.
- Pony Express Pipeline, operated by Tallgrass Energy Partners, flows from fields around Guernsey, Wyoming. It connects to the Ponca City Refinery. It has a capacity of 230,000 barrels per day (37,000 m^{3}/d) and capable of increasing to 400,000 barrels per day (64,000 m^{3}/d).
- Seaway Pipeline, a dual pipeline operated by Enbridge and Enterprise Products, flows out to Freeport, Texas. It has a maximum capacity of 850,000 barrels per day (135,000 m^{3}/d).
- SemCrude Pipeline System, operated by Rose Rock Midstream (Energy Transfer LP), flows from fields in Kansas and northern Oklahoma.
- Spearhead Pipelines, operated by Enbridge, is a pipeline that flows from the Enbridge Mainline System near Flanagan, Illinois. It has a maximum capacity of 125,000 barrels per day (19,900 m^{3}/d). A second pipeline, Flanagan South, parallels the Spearhead. A third Enbridge pipeline connects to the Wood River Refinery in Roxana, Illinois.
- White Cliffs Pipeline, operated by Rose Rock Midstream, flows from fields around Platteville, Colorado.

== Transhipment point for West Texas Intermediate ==
Cushing is the delivery point for West Texas Intermediate, a blend of US light sweet crude oil streams traded on the New York Mercantile Exchange

Cushing's strategic position as a major hub in oil supply led to WTI's development as a significant physical market price reference or benchmark for over three decades.

In 2005 Cushing was described as the most significant trading hub for crude oil in North America, connecting the Gulf Coast suppliers with northern consumers.

By 2007 Cushing held 5% to 10% of the total US crude inventory. Signs made of a pipe and valve on the major highways near town proclaim Cushing to be the "Pipeline Crossroads of the World", and the town is surrounded by several tank farms.

== Oil futures designated delivery point in the US ==
On April 13, 2007, the now-defunct Lehman Brothers released a study which claimed that West Texas Intermediate (WTI) crude at Cushing is no longer an accurate gauge of world oil prices. By May 2007, Cushing's inventory fell by nearly 35% as the oil-storage trade heated up.

Oil giant BP, and energy-transport and logistics firms Enbridge Energy Partners (an affiliate of Canada's Enbridge), Plains All American Pipeline and Energy Transfer LP own most of the oil storage tanks in Cushing.

Oil storage became big business in 2008 and 2009, when the supply glut in the oil market led to situation where oil futures were higher priced than their spot price. Many participants—including Wall Street giants, such as Morgan Stanley, Goldman Sachs, and Citicorp—turned sizeable profits simply by sitting on tanks of oil. Investors can choose to take profits or losses prior to the oil-delivery date on the basis of specific contracts. Alternatively, they can leave the contract in place and take physical delivery of the oil at an "officially designated delivery point" in the United States; this delivery point is usually Cushing.

On July 13, 2010, BP announced it will sell its assets in Cushing to Magellan Midstream Partners.

In April 2020, it was lack of storage capacity at Cushing which turned WTI petroleum futures contracts negative for the first time in history. While Cushing has maximum storage of about 90 million barrels across 15 terminals, working storage is closer to 76 million barrels, about 13% of total U.S. oil storage capacity. With 59.5 million barrels stored, little demand for oil from customers, and much of the remainder of the storage capacity already booked, traders holding contracts for hundreds of thousands of barrels of oil for delivery at Cushing on April 21 realized they had no place to put the oil, and storage fees charged under the contracts for not taking the oil could be astronomical. Thus paying a party having already-contracted storage capacity to take the oil was cheaper than incurring those contractual storage fees.

== Cushing storage hub bottleneck ==
The bottleneck at Cushing's giant storage hub distorted benchmark US oil prices for many years. In 2007 a large stockpile of oil at the facility was caused largely because Valero Energy Corp.'s McKee refinery near Sunray, Texas, was temporarily shut down. With the refinery closed, crude oil prices were artificially depressed at the Cushing pricing point. The Eagle North pipeline reactivated in 2010, adding offtake capacity to Cushing by connecting Valero's oil refinery in Ardmore, Oklahoma with Cushing's cheap crude oil. This should have resulted in boosting WTI prices which were discounted against Brent crude oil because of the glut.

In March 2013 Valero Energy Corp.'s (VLO) McKee refinery in Sunray, Texas was closed for five weeks for planned maintenance.

== Refineries ==
Cushing has had over 50 different refineries in the course of its history.

In May 2023, Cushing was selected as the site for a $5.56 billion crude oil refinery for processing 250,000 barrels per day of light and sweet crudes into low-carbon transportation fuels. The next-generation refinery, built with a goal of zero-carbon footprint operation, should be operational in 2027.

== Seismic activity ==
In October 2014 two moderate-sized earthquakes (Mw 4.0 and 4.3) struck south of Cushing, below one of the largest crude oil storage facility and gas pipeline transportation hubs in the world. The system also includes operational sections of the Keystone pipeline.

On 6 November 2016, around 7:44 pm, a 5.0 MW earthquake rattled north-central Oklahoma. The quake was centered one mile west of Cushing. It was the sixth 5.0 magnitude or higher to strike the state since 1882. Three of those larger quakes occurred in 2016, and the strongest ever recorded in Oklahoma was a 5.8 magnitude that hit Pawnee (25 miles from Cushing) in September.

According to George Choy, a geophysicist with the U.S. Geological Survey, Oklahoma has had a severe spike in earthquakes of 3.0 magnitude or higher since 2008. The number of 3.0 magnitude quakes rose from 2 in 2008 to 889 in 2015, according to USGS statistics. In 2016, there have been 572 (up to November). "The oil companies have said for a long time that these are natural earthquakes, that they would have occurred anyway," Choy said, "but when you look at the statistics, that argument does not fly."

Analysis of the spatial distribution of earthquakes and regional moment tensor focal mechanisms indicated reactivation of a subsurface unmapped strike-slip fault. The discovery stoked fears among scientists about other unknown faults that could be triggered by oil and gas wastewater being injected deep underground. Coulomb failure stress change calculations indicated that the Wilzetta Fault zone south of Cushing could produce a large, damaging earthquake comparable to the 2011 Oklahoma earthquake at Prague, Oklahoma.

Much of the production, using new horizontal drilling techniques, produces at very high rates, with very high water-to-oil ratios. Thus many of the disposal wells, which re-inject the brine into underground formations, handle much more water at much higher pressures than has been common in other, often older, plays. When high volume, high pressure liquids follow the planes in some susceptible dormant faults, it frequently causes them to slip, resulting in quakes. After the strongest earthquake in Oklahoma's history, at Pawnee, recorded at 5.8 on the Moment magnitude scale, concerns about the relationship between disposal wells and earthquakes caused state and federal regulators to respond by shutting down more than 50 disposal sites and wells across the state, considering their proximity to fault lines.

== See also ==
- List of oil pipelines
- List of oil refineries
- List of oil spills
