= Canton–Galva USD 419 =

Public school district in Canton, Kansas

Address
- 109 S. Main St. Canton, Kansas, 67428; United States
- Coordinates: 38.3853°N 97.4268°W

District information
- Type: Public
- Grades: K to 12
- Schools: 3

Other information
- Website: usd419.org

Canton–Galva USD 419 is a public unified school district headquartered in Canton, Kansas, United States. The district includes the communities of Canton, Galva, and nearby rural areas.

== Schools ==
The school district operates three schools:

- Canton-Galva High School in Canton.
- Canton-Galva Middle School in Galva.
- Canton-Galva Elementary School in Canton

== See also ==
- Kansas State Department of Education
- Kansas State High School Activities Association
- List of high schools in Kansas
- List of unified school districts in Kansas
