= Cushing, Oklahoma =

Cushing, Oklahoma Koshineki
- City
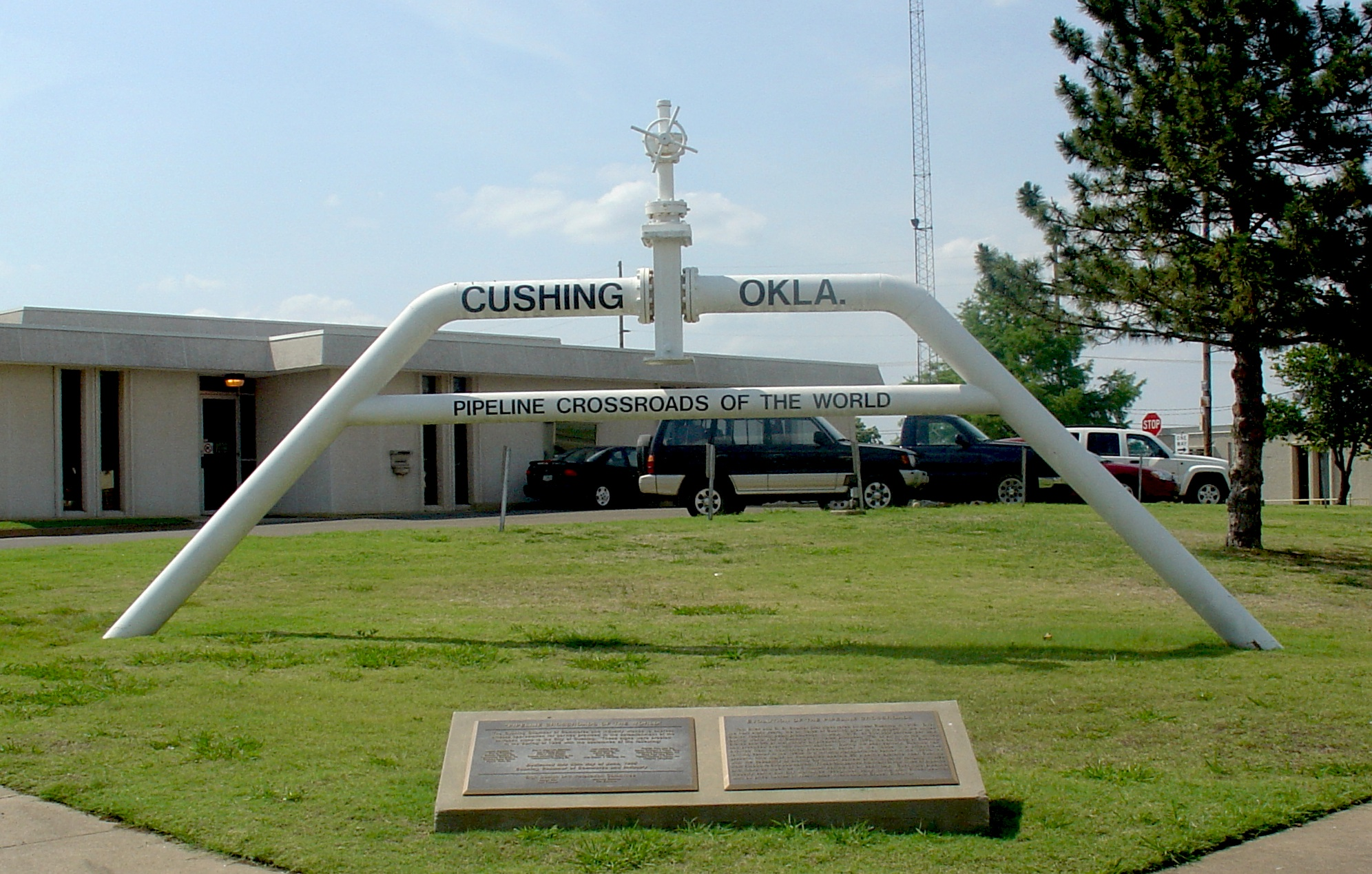
- Pipeline Crossroads of the World monument (2006)
- Nickname: "Pipeline Crossroads of the World"
- Location within Payne County and Oklahoma
- Coordinates: 35°58′47″N 96°45′39″W
- Country: United States
- State: Oklahoma
- County: Payne

Area
  - Total: 7.60 sq mi (19.69 km^{2})
  - Land: 7.59 sq mi (19.67 km^{2})
  - Water: 0.0077 sq mi (0.02 km^{2})
- Elevation: 922 ft (281 m)

Population (2020)
  - Total: 8,327
  - Density: 1,096.4/sq mi (423.32/km^{2})
- Time zone: UTC-6 (CST)
  - Summer (DST): UTC-5 (CDT)
- ZIP Code: 74023
- Area code: 539/918
- FIPS code: 40-18850
- GNIS feature ID: 2410279
- Website: cityofcushingok.gov

Cushing (Meskwaki: Koshineki, Iowa-Oto: Amína P^óp^oye Chína, meaning: "Soft-seat town") is a city in Payne County, Oklahoma, United States. As of the 2020 census, Cushing had a population of 8,327. Cushing was established after the Land Run of 1891 by William "Billy Rae" Little. It was named for Marshall Cushing, private secretary to U.S. Postmaster General John Wanamaker.

The city is primarily known for its oil industry. A 1912 oil boom led to the city's development as a refining center, with over 50 refineries operating in Cushing over its history. Today, Cushing is a major trading hub for crude oil and a price settlement point for West Texas Intermediate on the New York Mercantile Exchange, and is more generally the main oil-pricing hub of the United States. It is known as the "Pipeline Crossroads of the World".

== History ==
The area that became Cushing was part of the Sac and Fox Nation. With the Land Run of 1891, a former government trader for the tribe, William Rea "Billy" Little, built a house, established his claim, and laid out town lots. The town got a post office on November 10, 1891, and was named for Marshall Cushing, private secretary to U.S. Postmaster General John Wanamaker.

In 1902, the Eastern Oklahoma Railway line to Cushing was built. The Missouri, Kansas and Texas Railway added service on its own line built in 1903.

Wildcatter Thomas B. Slick started an oil boom on March 17, 1912, when he brought in a gusher east of Cushing. Other wells were soon drilled nearby, and the oil field became known as the Cushing-Drumright Oil Field. The city became a center for exploration of and production from nearby oil fields and also a refining center, when Consumers Oil Company opened a refinery in 1913. Production centered on the new town of Drumright, and Cushing became a refining center. Eventually, 23 oil companies and five oil-field supply houses located in the town, and more than 50 refineries once operated in the Cushing area. Pipelines and storage facilities have since made it "the pipeline crossroads of the world".

The oil boom did not last long. Production peaked in 1915 with 8.3 million barrels of oil, but went down by 50% in 1916. As the oil fields started to run dry, starting in the 1940s, production and refining became less important. During the 1970s and 1980s refining operations continued in Cushing until the last two refineries, Kerr-McGee and Hudson, closed. Rail service ended in 1982.

The town retained the Shell pipeline terminal, with 39 storage tanks and pipelines that could move as much as 1.5 million barrels a day. This enhanced Cushing's status as "Pipeline Crossroads of the World".

The maze of pipelines and tanks that had been built led to the New York Mercantile Exchange choosing Cushing as the official delivery point for its light sweet crude futures contract in 1983.

In May 2023, Cushing was selected as the site for a $5.56 billion crude oil refinery for processing 250,000 barrels per day of light and sweet crudes into transportation fuels. Expected to be completed in 2027, and built with such technologies as solar power and carbon sequestration, it has a goal of eliminating 95% of the greenhouse gas emissions normally associated with oil refining.

== Geography ==
Cushing is located in Payne County at the intersection of Oklahoma State Highway 18 and Oklahoma State Highway 33.

According to the United States Census Bureau, the city has a total area of 7.6 square miles (20 km^{2}), of which 7.6 square miles (20 km^{2}) is land and 0.13% is water.

=== Climate ===
Climate data for Cushing, Oklahoma
Month	Jan	Feb	Mar	Apr	May	Jun	Jul	Aug	Sep	Oct	Nov	Dec	Year
Record high °F (°C)	81 (27)	83 (28)	92 (33)	101 (38)	100 (38)	108 (42)	117 (47)	112 (44)	110 (43)	99 (37)	85 (29)	82 (28)	117 (47)
Mean daily maximum °F (°C)	48 (9)	54 (12)	61 (16)	73 (23)	80 (27)	89 (32)	94 (34)	95 (35)	88 (31)	76 (24)	62 (17)	52 (11)	73 (23)
Mean daily minimum °F (°C)	25 (−4)	30 (−1)	36 (2)	49 (9)	59 (15)	67 (19)	71 (22)	70 (21)	61 (16)	51 (11)	37 (3)	29 (−2)	49 (9)
Record low °F (°C)	−11 (−24)	3 (−16)	−2 (−19)	23 (−5)	32 (0)	45 (7)	55 (13)	51 (11)	35 (2)	24 (−4)	10 (−12)	−1 (−18)	−11 (−24)
Average precipitation inches (mm)	1.3 (33)	1.6 (41)	2.1 (53)	3.5 (89)	5.8 (150)	5.1 (130)	4.3 (110)	2.7 (69)	3.7 (94)	3 (76)	1.6 (41)	1.3 (33)	35.8 (910)
Average snowfall inches (cm)	3.6 (9.1)	2.1 (5.3)	1.3 (3.3)	0.1 (0.25)	—	—	—	—	—	—	0.3 (0.76)	1.4 (3.6)	8.8 (22)
Average rainy days	3.3	3.9	5	6.5	7.4	7.8	7.1	5.2	5.9	5	3.1	3.3	63.5
Average relative humidity (%)	70	68	63	62	70	69	66	64	63	63	61	66	65
Source 1: weather.com
Source 2: Weatherbase.com

== Demographics ==
Historical population
Census	Pop.	Note	%±
1900	226		—
1910	1,072		374.3%
1920	6,326		490.1%
1930	9,301		47.0%
1940	7,703		−17.2%
1950	8,414		9.2%
1960	8,619		2.4%
1970	7,529		−12.6%
1980	7,720		2.5%
1990	7,218		−6.5%
2000	8,371		16.0%
2010	7,826		−6.5%
2020	8,327		6.4%
U.S. Decennial Census

=== 2020 census ===
As of the 2020 census, Cushing had a population of 8,327 and a median age of 36.5 years. Children under 18 made up 20.3% of residents while 14.4% were 65 or older, and there were 137.6 males for every 100 females (148.2 males per 100 females age 18 and over).

There were 2,786 households in Cushing, of which 30.7% had children under the age of 18 living in them. Of all households, 40.3% were married-couple households, 20.5% were households with a male householder and no spouse or partner present, and 31.0% were households with a female householder and no spouse or partner present. About 31.5% of all households were made up of individuals and 14.8% had someone living alone who was 65 years of age or older.

There were 3,428 housing units, of which 18.7% were vacant. Among occupied housing units, 58.2% were owner-occupied and 41.8% were renter-occupied. The homeowner vacancy rate was 5.6% and the rental vacancy rate was 15.9%.

78.9% of residents lived in urban areas, while 21.1% lived in rural areas.

Racial composition as of the 2020 census
Race	Percent
White	70.3%
Black or African American	8.8%
American Indian and Alaska Native	7.8%
Asian	0.4%
Native Hawaiian and Other Pacific Islander	<0.1%
Some other race	3.4%
Two or more races	9.2%
Hispanic or Latino (of any race)	6.8%

=== 2000 census ===
As of the census of 2000, there were 8,371 people, 3,071 households, and 2,002 families residing in the city. The population density was 1,096.1 inhabitants per square mile (423.2/km^{2}). There were 3,636 housing units at an average density of 476.1 per square mile (183.8/km^{2}). The racial makeup of the city was 79.66% White, 7.02% African American, 7.97% Native American, 0.13% Asian, 0.90% from other races, and 4.32% from two or more races. Hispanic or Latino of any race were 2.70% of the population.

There were 3,071 households, out of which 29.9% had children under the age of 18 living with them, 48.7% were married couples living together, 12.4% had a female householder with no husband present, and 34.8% were non-families. 31.3% of all households were made up of individuals, and 16.1% had someone living alone who was 65 years of age or older. The average household size was 2.39 and the average family size was 2.99.

In the city, the population was spread out, with 22.9% under the age of 18, 10.0% from 18 to 24, 29.5% from 25 to 44, 20.0% from 45 to 64, and 17.6% who were 65 years of age or older. The median age was 37 years. For every 100 females, there were 111.4 males. For every 100 females age 18 and over, there were 115.6 males.

The median income for a household in the city was $26,483, and the median income for a family was $32,284. Males had a median income of $26,710 versus $17,711 for females. The per capita income for the city was $12,620. About 15.1% of families and 16.4% of the population were below the poverty line, including 21.0% of those under age 18 and 10.1% of those age 65 or over.

== Economy ==
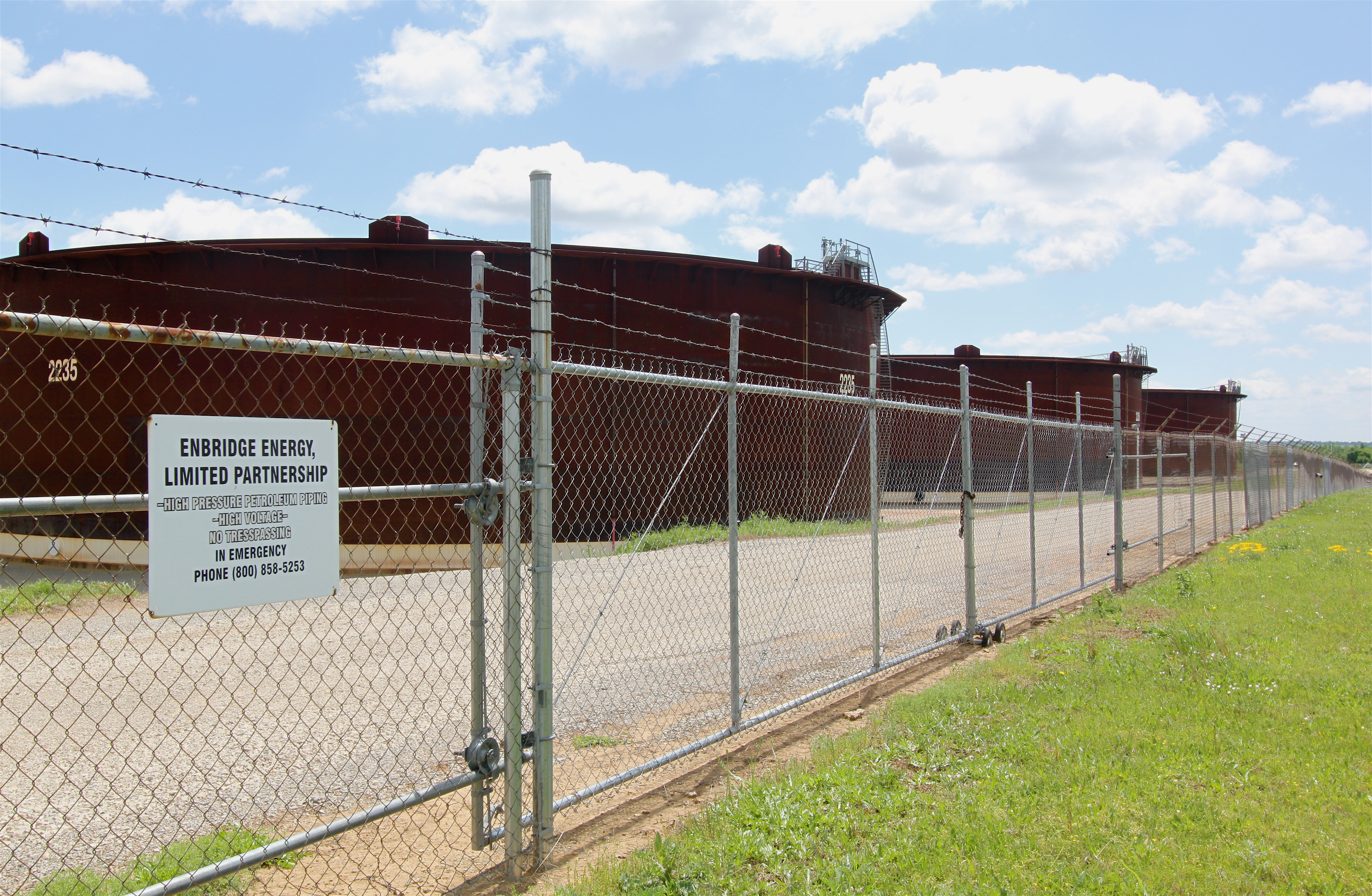
Enbridge crude oil tank farm near Cushing has a maximum storage capacity of 20,060,000 barrels (3,189,000 m^{3}) (2010)

Cushing is a major crude oil hub within the United States and worldwide oil industry. It is a "vital transshipment point with many intersecting pipelines, storage facilities and easy access to refiners and suppliers". Crude oil flows "inbound to Cushing from all directions and outbound through dozens of pipelines". Crude oil tank farms around Cushing have over 90 million barrels of storage capacity.

The new refinery announced in May 2023 is expected to create 423 direct jobs and produce a payroll of $39.3 million, resulting in a total economic impact of $18.2 billion over the following decade.

== Sports ==
Cushing was home to minor league baseball. The Cushing Oilers and Cushing Refiners played as members of the Class D Southwestern League (1921), the Class D Oklahoma State League (1923–1924) and Southwestern League (1925). Baseball Hall of Fame member Carl Hubbell made his professional debut with the 1923 Cushing Refiners.

== Parks and recreation ==
The foundations of Cushing Municipal Park were established in 1935 with Cushing Memorial Park, constructed by the WPA. Over time, more and more features have been added, including a Duck Pond, a picnic pavilion, gazebos, various playground areas, skate park, disc golf course, sand volleyball court, and baseball diamond. The Cushing Aquatic Center includes a splashpad, wading pool, full sized pool with swim lanes, and a three-tiered ramp with 5 pool slides.

Main Street is the locale for the Downtown Cushing Centennial Park, which has a stage and picnic tables with umbrellas.

Buffalo Rock Golf and Venue Golf Course, originally the Cushing Country Club dating from 1921, is an 18-hole course open to the public.

Cushing Lake, 6 miles west of the city, offers a boat ramp, dock, and picnic area.

== Government ==
Cushing has a commissioner-manager form of government.

The Cimarron Correctional Facility is located three miles southwest of Cushing. Due to reductions by the Oklahoma Department of Corrections in the number of inmates put in private prisons because of budgetary issues, owner CoreCivic announced closure of the facility in July 2020.

== Education ==
The Cushing school district has five schools that include a preschool, two elementary schools, a middle school, and a high school. The district serves approximately 1,800 students.

== Transportation ==
Cushing is at the eastern intersection of State Highway 33 (east-west) and State Highway 18 (north-south).

Cushing is served by the Cushing Municipal Airport (KCUH, or FAA Identifier CUH), featuring a paved 5201' x 100' runway. Commercial air transportation is available out of the Stillwater Regional Airport about 20 miles to the northwest, and the Tulsa International Airport, about 59 miles to the east-northeast.

== Historic Sites ==
The following are NRHP-listed:

- The Bassett House
- Luke D. Berry House
- Cushing American Legion Building
- Cushing Armory
- Gillespie Drilling Company Building
- Christian K. Usher Luston House

== Notable people ==
- Paul Blair, professional baseball player
- Al Buell, painter of pin-up art
- Kelly Cook, running back in the National Football League
- Harold DeMarsh, first ever NCAA Wrestling Champion
- Brian Kelly, professional boxer
- Frank Lewis, Olympic gold medalist in freestyle wrestling at 1936 Summer Olympics
- Robert Pearce, Olympic gold medalist in freestyle wrestling at 1932 Summer Olympics
- Jay Rubenstein, Rhodes Scholar, MacArthur Fellow, medieval historian
- Bob Shirley, professional baseball pitcher
