= Canton Township Carnegie Library =

- U.S. National Register of Historic Places
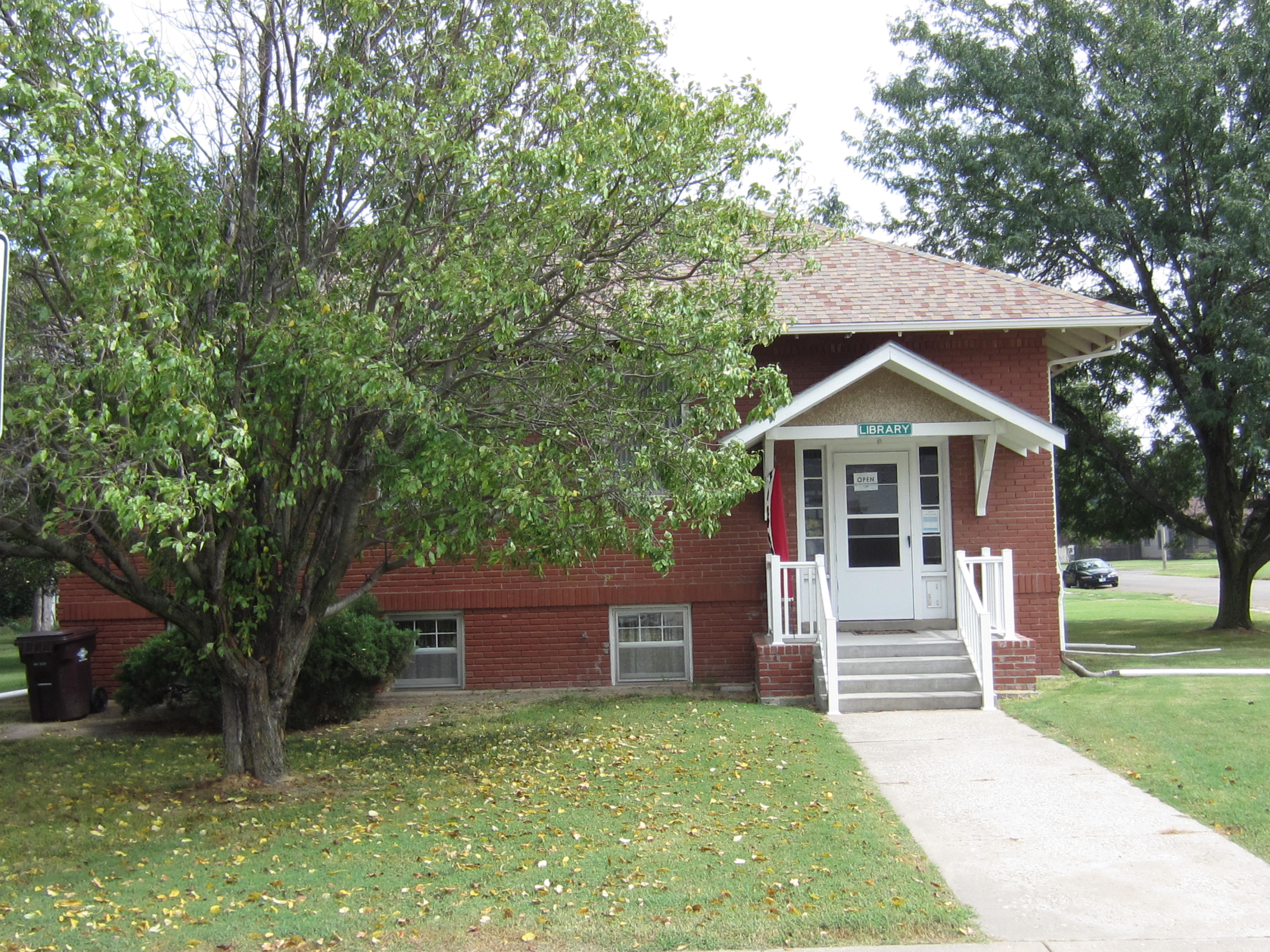

- Location within Kansas Location within the United States
- Location: Canton, Kansas, United States
- Coordinates: 38°23′17″N 97°25′35″W
- Built: 1921
- Built by: S.E. Willey
- Architect: Washburn & Stookey
- MPS: Carnegie Libraries of Kansas TR
- NRHP reference No.: 87000960
- Added to NRHP: June 25, 1987

The Canton Township Carnegie Library is an historic Carnegie library at 203 North Main Street in Canton, Kansas, United States.

The library was built in 1921. It was the last Carnegie library built in the United States with Carnegie Foundation funding. The library was added to the National Register of Historic Places in 1987.

The community received $6,000 Carnegie Foundation funding in 1916; the library was completed in 1921.
