= Guardian Pipeline =

American natural gas pipeline

Guardian Pipeline is a small natural gas pipeline that brings gas from northern Illinois into Wisconsin. It is owned by ONEOK Partners, G.P. It is operated by ONEOK Partners, L.P. Its FERC code is 184.
