= Schnake Turnbo Frank =

- Industry: Marketing, Public relations
- Founded: 1970
- Founder: Chuck Schnake
- Headquarters: Tulsa, Oklahoma, Oklahoma City, Oklahoma
- Key people: Russ Florence (CEO)
- Website: schnake.com

Schnake Turnbo Frank is a public relations and leadership development firm with offices in Tulsa, Oklahoma and Oklahoma City, Oklahoma. Founded in 1970 in Tulsa by Charles Schnake, STF is the oldest public relations firm in Oklahoma. Steve Turnbo joined the firm in 1982, creating Schnake Turnbo & Associates. Schnake served as chairman emeritus until 2023, when he died at the age of 78.

== History ==
The firm was founded in 1970 by Chuck Schnake. Steve Turnbo joined the company in 1982.

Becky J. Frank joined the firm as a partner in 2000 and was named CEO in 2006. She now serves as a Partner and Chair in the company. Russ Florence joined the firm in 2000 and has been a partner in the company since 2007. In 2022, Florence was named CEO.

In 2008, the firm expanded into Oklahoma City. In 2009, it was announced that Schnake Turnbo was acquired by Becky Frank and Russ Florence.

Aaron Fulkerson and David Wagner joined the firm in 2010 and now serve as partners.
