= Oklahoma Natural Gas =

Largest natural gas distributor in Oklahoma

- Company type: Division of One Gas
- Industry: Natural gas utility
- Founded: 1906; 120 years ago
- Headquarters: Oklahoma City, Oklahoma, United States
- Products: Natural gas distribution
- Number of employees: 1,100
- Parent: ONE Gas
- Website: www.oklahomanaturalgas.com

Oklahoma Natural Gas is the largest natural gas distributor in the state of Oklahoma. Originally founded in 1906, it is one of the oldest corporations in Oklahoma. Oklahoma Natural Gas is a regulated public utility which serves 871,000 customers, employing 1,100 employees. It operates 19,200 miles of service lines, pipelines and other natural gas properties. Oklahoma Natural Gas is a division of One Gas, Inc.

Oklahoma Natural Gas has offices located across the state with a division office in downtown Oklahoma City.

== History ==
One Gas is a successor to the company founded in 1906 as Oklahoma Natural Gas Company, and became Oneok, Inc. (NYSE: OKE) in 1980. Oneok separated its natural gas distribution business in 2014 to create One Gas, Inc.

To cover debt incurred due to high natural gas prices during the 2021 Texas power crisis, Oklahoma Natural Gas is charging customers up to $7.80 per month for the next 25 years to securitize its costs of $1.4 billion during the crisis. It is also charging customers an exit fee of $687 to who wish to switch their homes to electricity.
