= Oklahoma City Oil Field =

Oil field in Oklahoma City, USA

Coordinates: 35.4909°N 97.5033°W

The Oklahoma City Oil Field is one of the world's giant petroleum fields and is located in Oklahoma City, Oklahoma in the United States of America. The field was opened just south of the city limits on December 4, 1928, and first entered Oklahoma City limits on May 27, 1930.

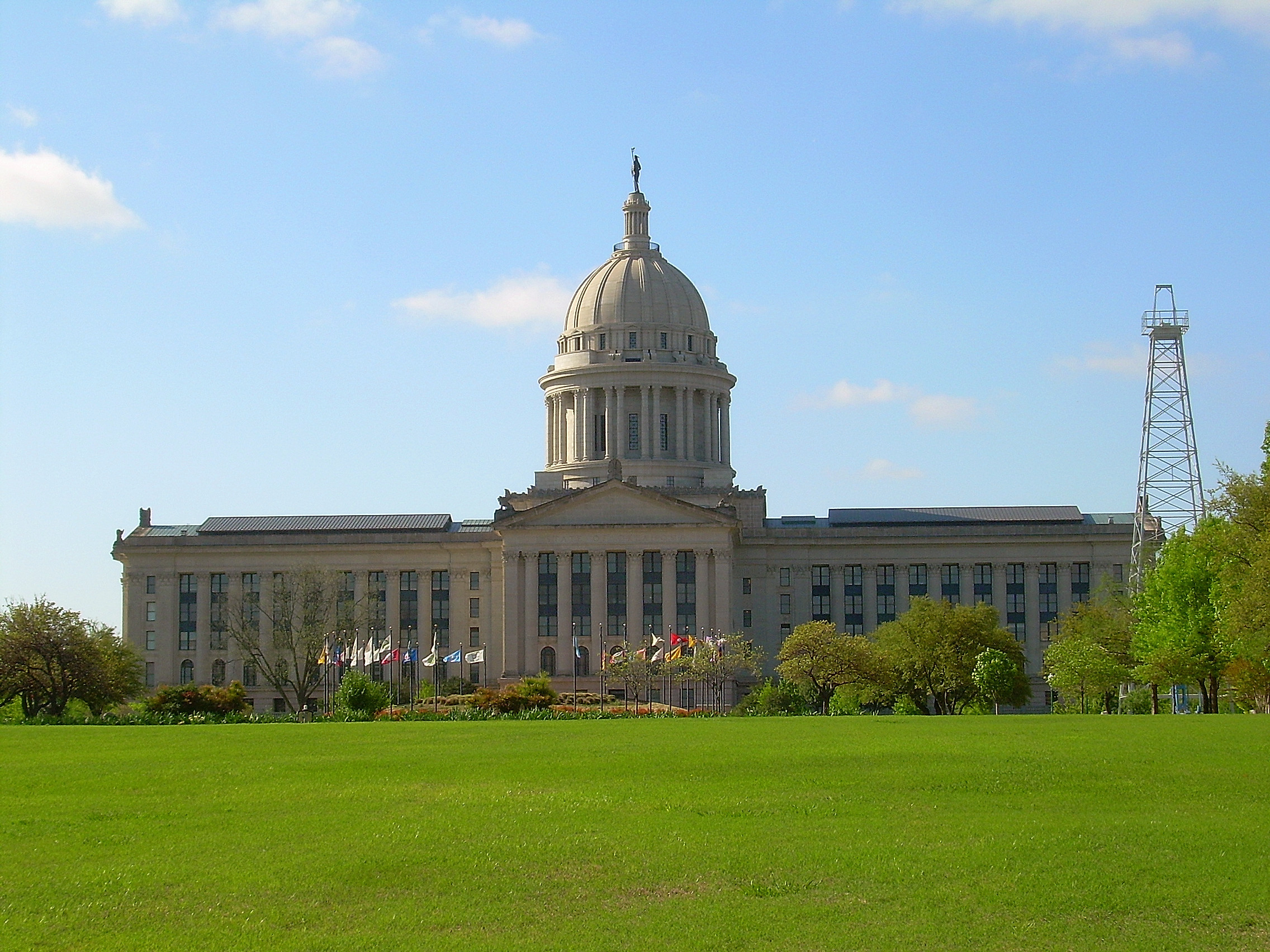
Petunia Oil Well in front of the Oklahoma state capitol in Oklahoma City, OK on April 3, 2007

The field includes drill sites around the Oklahoma State Capitol and other nearby state government buildings.

== History ==
The field was the first within an urban area in Oklahoma and caused immediate friction. The Oklahoma Corporation Commission passed an order stopping all drilling for 30 days on September 11, 1929. The Oklahoma City Council passed an ordinance in 1930 to limit drilling to one well per city block. Subsequent legal challenges and flagrant violations of the law led to Governor William H. Murray's declarations of martial law around the wells on May 5 and June 6 of 1932 and March 4, 1933. It also led to House Bill 481, passed April 10, 1933.

The discovery well, the Indian Territory Oil Illuminating Company (ITIO) and Foster Petroleum Corporation Oklahoma City Number 1 well was drilled on a surface anticlinal structure in the Garber Sandstone of Permian age and was completed in the Cambro-Ordovician Arbuckle Limestone for an IPF of 6,564 barrels (1,044 m^{3}) of oil per day at a depth of 6,624 feet (2,019 m). Subsequent development drilling opened up numerous other reservoirs including the Ordovician Basal Oil Creek Sand and the prolific Simpson "Wilcox" Sand. Initial flow rates in the "Wilcox Sand" were nothing short of spectacular often exceeding 20,000 barrels (3,200 m^{3}) of oil per day and 20 million cubic feet (570,000 m^{3}) per day. The field is approximately 12 by 4.5 miles (19.3 km × 7.2 km) and encompasses 32 square miles (83 km^{2}) with a productive area of 13,770 acres (55.7 km^{2}).

Subsurface mapping of the field demonstrated that the producing north-south trending anticlinal structure is bounded on the east by large normal fault with over 2,000 feet (610 m) of throw. The anticline has over 1,000 feet (300 m) of producing structural closure. Stratigraphically, the Oklahoma City anticline is a "bald-headed structure" with a major unconformity at the base of the Pennsylvanian sediments. Because of this, the most prolific reservoir of the field, the "Wilcox Sand", was found at the structurally lowest producing position within the field and was the last of the major Ordovician reservoirs to be developed.

The high gas pressure wells suffered blowouts in the 1930s, the most prominent being the Wild Mary Sudik well.

Cumulative production from the field is in excess of 1 billion barrels of oil equivalent.

== Geology ==
Cross Section of the Oklahoma City Oil Field

The Oklahoma City Oil Field is in a faulted anticlinal structure located on the southern end of the Nemaha Ridge and the northeast rim of the Anadarko Basin. The vertical normal fault bounds the anticline on the east side and the displacement of about 2,000 feet (610 m) occurred simultaneously with the folding, forming a structural trap. The top of the structural trap is marked by a pre-Pennsylvanian unconformity with sediments subcropping against the Oswego Lime. The sedimentary section starts with the Arbuckle Dolomite overlain by Simpson strata, which includes the Oil Creek, McLish, Tulip Creek, and Wilcox sandstones, of Ordovician age, with the Wilcox being the most productive zone. The Oswego limestone of Pennsylvanian age is a noted producer of gas.
