= Humboldt Fault =

Geological fault in Kansas and Nebraska, US

The Humboldt Fault (red) and Midcontinent Rift System (green) in Kansas and Nebraska

The Humboldt Fault or Humboldt Fault Zone, is a normal fault or series of faults, that extends from Nebraska southwestwardly through most of Kansas in the United States.

Kansas is not particularly earthquake prone, ranking 45th out of 50 states by damage caused. However, the north-central part of the state, particularly Riley and Pottawatomie counties, is the most prone to earthquakes. The Humboldt Fault had the largest earthquake in Kansas history with the 1867 Manhattan, Kansas earthquake. It happened near the town of Wamego and was estimated at 5.5 on the Richter scale. Reportedly it was felt as far away as Dubuque, Iowa.

== See also ==
- Extensional tectonics
- Midcontinent Rift System
- Nemaha Ridge
