= Scientific Computer Applications =

Scientific Computer Applications Inc.
- Company type: Private company
- Industry: Scientific Software
- Founded: 1969
- Headquarters: 2815 East Skelly Drive, Tulsa, Oklahoma, USA 74105
- Key people: Dick Banks, (President)

Scientific Computer Applications Inc. (SCAI) is a privately held, American company based in Tulsa, Oklahoma. SCAI develops and markets scientific software focused on the Oil exploration and production segment of the petroleum industry.

Scientific Computer Applications, Inc. (SCAI) was established in 1969 as an Oil & Gas Consulting firm by Professional engineering Petroleum Consultant Richard Banks, a graduate of the Colorado School of Mines and the University of Texas.

SCAI markets contour map software that generates single surface, multiple surfaces, contour mapping, and Reservoir Integration applications for the Personal computer.

== History ==
Dick Banks, a Colorado School of Mines graduate, and Joe Sukkar, Ph.D., began a partnership in 1969 with the development of a contour mapping software package based on Triangulation (topology). Triangulation is more rigorous than gridded contour map software because the original data points are always honored, and not estimated as in Grid map software.

== See also ==
- Fred Meissner
- Geographic information system
- List of geographic information systems software
- Comparison of geographic information systems software
- Scientific software
- List of information graphics software
- Oil reserves
- Reservoir engineering
- Extraction of petroleum
