= Magellan Midstream Partners =

American oil pipeline corporation

Magellan Midstream Partners, L.P.
- Company type: Subsidiary
- Traded as: NYSE: MMP (2006–2023)
- Headquarters: Tulsa, Oklahoma, United States
- Key people: Aaron L. Milford (CEO & President)
- Revenue: ▼US$2.32 billion (2022)
- Operating income: ▼US$1.01 billion (2022)
- Net income: ▼US$817 million (2022)
- Total assets: ▲US$8.03 billion (2022)
- Total equity: ▲US$1.90 billion (2022)
- Number of employees: 1,655 (2022)
- Parent: Oneok
- Website: magellanlp.com

Magellan Midstream Partners, L.P. is an American energy pipeline operator based in Tulsa, Oklahoma that primarily transports, stores and distributes refined petroleum products and crude oil.

It owns ammonia and petroleum pipelines in the Mid-Continent oil province. According to the United States Department of State, it owns "83 petroleum products terminals, more than 9,000 miles of refined products pipeline, 800 miles of crude oil pipeline and a 1,100-mile ammonia pipeline system."

== History ==
The company went public through an initial public offering in February 2006 with a listing on the New York Stock Exchange. Company executives, including its CEO Michael Mears, rang the NYSE closing bell on February 8, 2016.

In May 2023, midstream energy services provider Oneok agreed to acquire Magellan in a cash-and-stock transaction valued at US$18.8 billion, including debt. The transaction completed in September 2023 and Magellan became a fully owned subsidiary of Oneok.
