= Nemaha Ridge =

Geological fault in Kansas, US

Structures of Kansas showing the Nemaha Uplift/Ridge

The Nemaha Ridge (also called the Nemaha Uplift and the Nemaha Anticline) is located in the Central United States. It is a buried structural zone associated with a granite high in the Pre-Cambrian basement that extends from approximately Omaha, Nebraska to Oklahoma City, Oklahoma. The ridge is associated with the seismically active Humboldt Fault zone. It is also associated with the Proterozoic Midcontinent Rift System, which extends into northern Kansas about fifty miles west of the Nemaha.

Along the Nemaha Ridge is a series of faults referred to as the "Nemaha Fault Zone". The long term uplift along the ridge has been attributed to isostatic uplift due to the anomalously thick crust adjacent to the Midcontinent Rift.

== See also ==
- Geologic hydrogen
