= One Gas =

American publicly traded natural gas utility

One Gas, Inc.
- Type: Public
- Traded as: NYSE: OGS; S&P 400 Component
- Industry: Natural gas utility
- Founded: 2014; 12 years ago
- Headquarters: Tulsa, Oklahoma, U.S.
- Key people: Robert S. McAnnally (President and CEO)
- Products: Natural Gas
- Divisions: Oklahoma Natural Gas; Kansas Gas Service; Texas Gas Service
- Website: http://www.onegas.com/

One Gas, Inc. is a stand-alone, 100 percent regulated, publicly traded natural gas utility and is one of the largest natural gas utilities in the United States.

One Gas provides natural gas distribution services to more than 2 million customers in Oklahoma, Kansas and Texas. Headquartered in Tulsa, Oklahoma, it comprises three operating companies–Oklahoma Natural Gas, Kansas Gas Service, and Texas Gas Service. Its service territory covers most of Oklahoma, much of the eastern half of Kansas, and several disparate portions of Texas.

Its largest natural gas distribution markets by customer count are Oklahoma City and Tulsa, Oklahoma; Kansas City, Wichita and Topeka, Kansas; and Austin and El Paso, Texas. One Gas serves residential, commercial, industrial, transportation and wholesale customers in all three states. It is the largest natural gas distributor in Oklahoma and Kansas, and the third-largest in Texas, in terms of customer count.

One Gas was founded in February 2014 when Oneok spun off its distribution subsidiaries. In effect, Oneok was spinning out the core of the original Oklahoma Natural Gas Company, which was founded in 1906 and changed its name to Oneok in 1980.
