= Piping =

System of pipes used to transport fluids

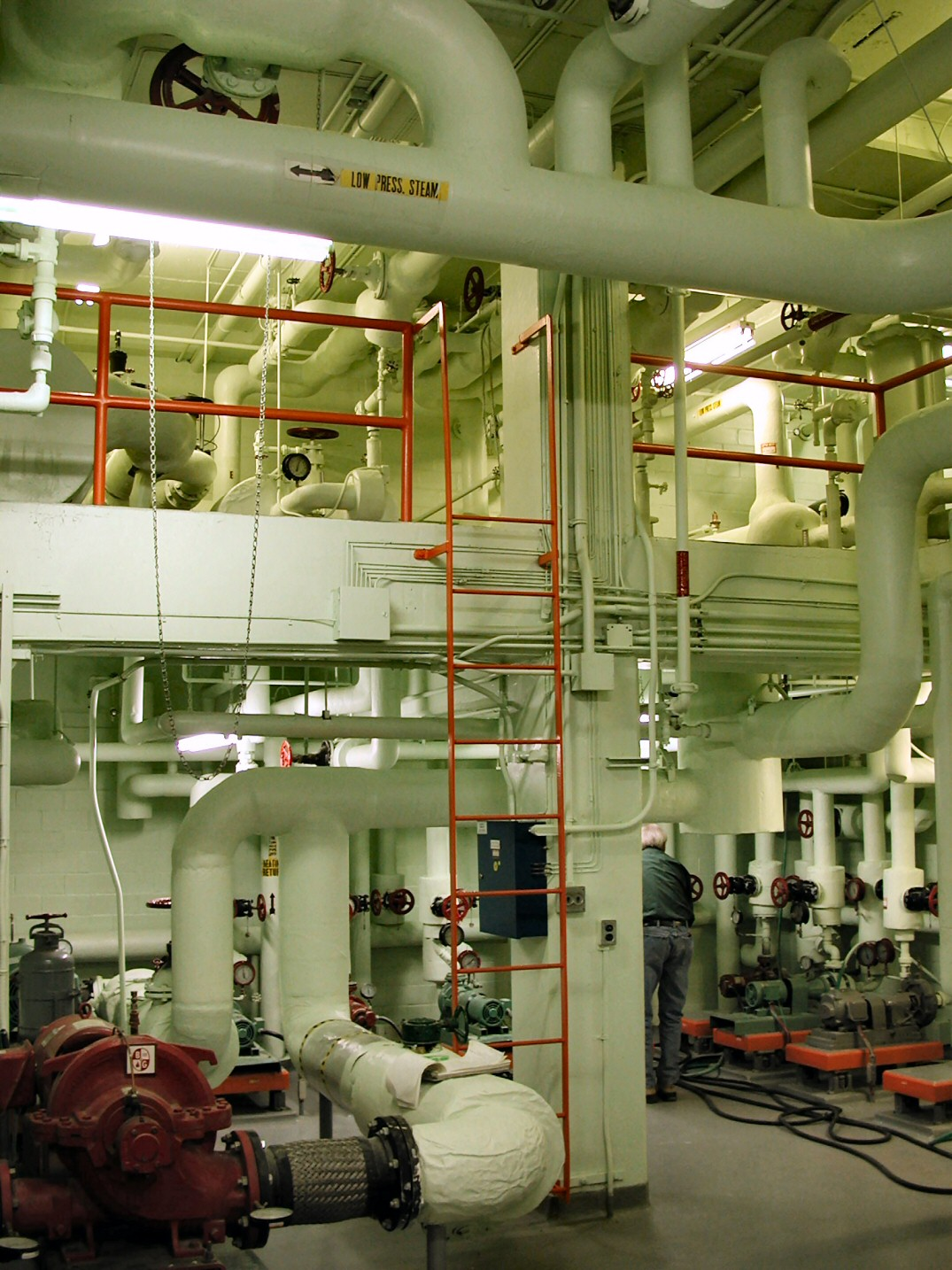
Large-scale piping system in an HVAC mechanical room

Within industry, piping is a system of pipes used to convey fluids (liquids and gases) from one location to another. The engineering discipline of piping design studies the efficient transport of fluid.

Industrial process piping (and accompanying in-line components) can be manufactured from wood, fiberglass, glass, steel, aluminum, plastic, copper, and concrete. The in-line components, known as fittings, valves, and other devices, typically sense and control the pressure, flow rate and temperature of the transmitted fluid, and usually are included in the field of piping design (or piping engineering), though the sensors and automatic controlling devices may alternatively be treated as part of instrumentation and control design. Piping systems are documented in piping and instrumentation diagrams (P&IDs). If necessary, pipes can be cleaned by the tube cleaning process.

Piping sometimes refers to piping design, the detailed specification of the physical piping layout within a process plant or commercial building. In earlier days, this was sometimes called drafting, technical drawing, engineering drawing, and design, but is today commonly performed by designers that have learned to use automated computer-aided drawing or computer-aided design (CAD) software.

Plumbing is a piping system with which most people are familiar, as it constitutes the form of fluid transportation that is used to provide potable water and fuels to their homes and businesses. Plumbing pipes also remove waste in the form of sewage, and allow venting of sewage gases to the outdoors. Fire sprinkler systems also use piping, and may transport nonpotable or potable water, or other fire-suppression fluids.

Piping also has many other industrial applications, which are crucial for moving raw and semi-processed fluids for refining into more useful products. Some of the more exotic materials used in pipe construction are Inconel, titanium, chrome-moly and various other steel alloys.

== Engineering sub-fields ==
Generally, industrial piping engineering has three major sub-fields:

- Piping material
- Piping design
- Stress analysis

== Stress analysis ==
Process piping and power piping are typically checked by pipe stress engineers to verify that the routing, nozzle loads, hangers, and supports are properly placed and selected such that allowable pipe stress is not exceeded under different loads such as sustained loads, operating loads, pressure testing loads, etc., as stipulated by the ASME B31, EN 13480, GOST 32388, RD 10-249 or any other applicable codes and standards. It is necessary to evaluate the mechanical behavior of the piping under regular loads (internal pressure and thermal stresses) as well under occasional and intermittent loading cases such as earthquake, high wind or special vibration, and water hammer. This evaluation is usually performed with the assistance of a specialized (finite element) pipe stress analysis computer programs such as AutoPIPE, CAEPIPE, CAESAR, PASS/START-PROF, or ROHR2.

In cryogenic pipe supports, most steel become more brittle as the temperature decreases from normal operating conditions, so it is necessary to know the temperature distribution for cryogenic conditions. Steel structures will have areas of high stress that may be caused by sharp corners in the design, or inclusions in the material. When 3D pipe stress is analyzed, it (3D Pipes) will be considered as 3D beams with supports on both sides. Moreover, the 3D pipe stress determines the bending moments of the pipes. Allowable (ASME) Pipe grades permitted for Oil and gas industries are : Carbon Steel Pipes and tubes (A53 Grade [A & B], A106 Grade [B & C]), Low & Intermediate alloy steel Pipes (A333 Grade [6], A335 Grade [P5, P9, P11, P12, P91])

== Materials ==
The material with which a pipe is manufactured often forms as the basis for choosing any pipe. Materials that are used for manufacturing pipes include:

- Carbon steel
- ASTM A252 Spec Grade 1, Grade 2, Grade 3 Steel Pile Pipe
- Plastic piping, e.g. HDPE pipe, PE-X pipe, PP-R pipe or LDPE pipe.
- Low temperature service carbon steel
- Stainless steel
- Nonferrous metals, e.g. cupro-nickel, tantalum lined, etc.
- Nonmetallic, e.g. tempered glass, Teflon lined, PVC, etc.

== History ==
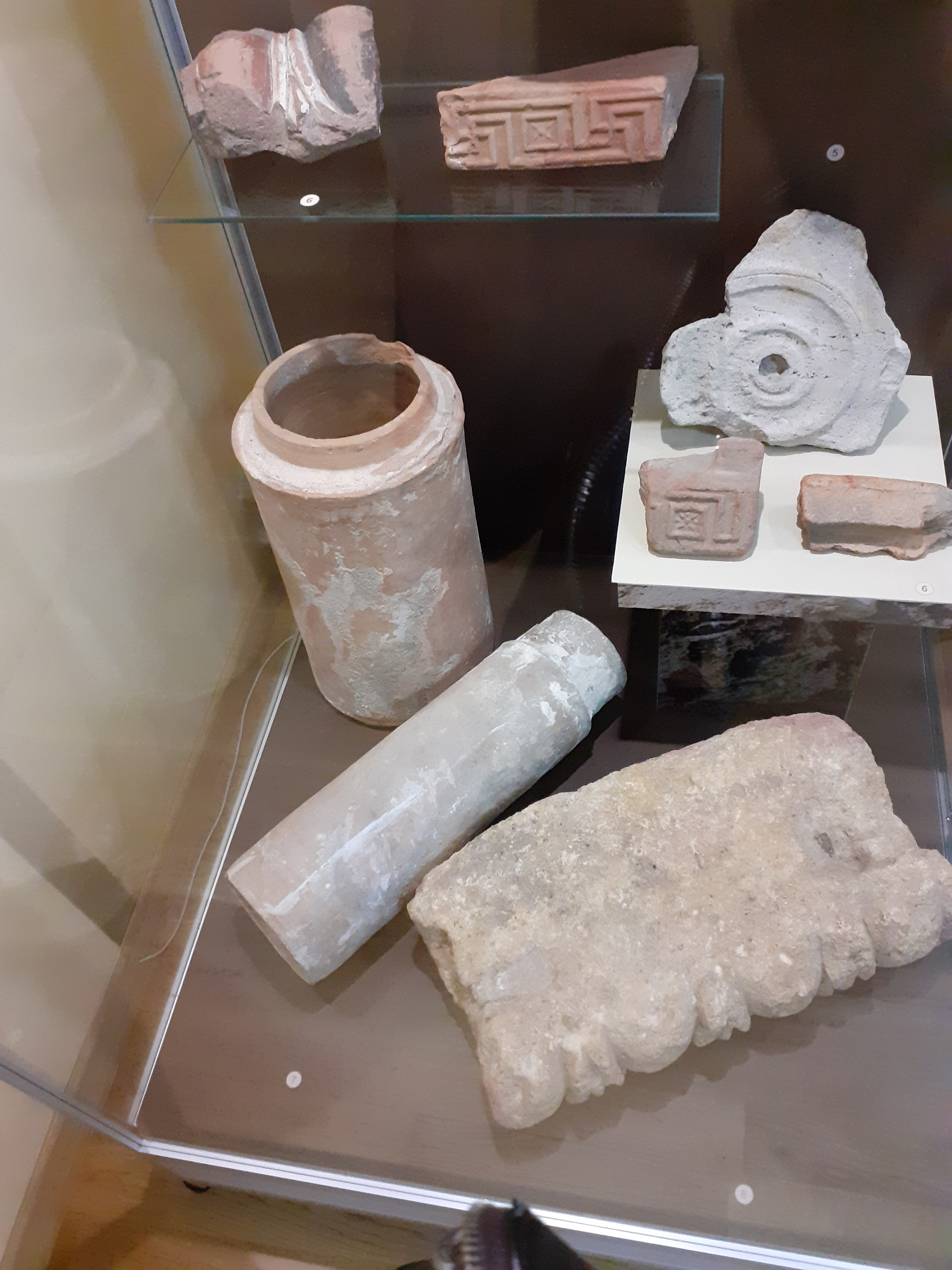
Ukraine, Olbia, elements of water pipes, the beginning of our era. Mykolaiv Regional Museum of Local History

Early wooden pipes were constructed out of logs that had a large hole bored lengthwise through the center. Later wooden pipes were constructed with staves and hoops similar to wooden barrel construction. Stave pipes have the advantage that they are easily transported as a compact pile of parts on a wagon and then assembled as a hollow structure at the job site. Wooden pipes were especially popular in mountain regions where transport of heavy iron or concrete pipes would have been difficult.

Wooden pipes were easier to maintain than metal, because the wood did not expand or contract with temperature changes as much as metal and so consequently expansion joints and bends were not required. The thickness of wood afforded some insulating properties to the pipes which helped prevent freezing as compared to metal pipes. Wood used for water pipes also does not rot very easily. Electrolysis does not affect wood pipes at all, since wood is a much better electrical insulator.

In the Western United States where redwood was used for pipe construction, it was found that redwood had "peculiar properties" that protected it from weathering, acids, insects, and fungus growths. Redwood pipes stayed smooth and clean indefinitely while iron pipe by comparison would rapidly begin to scale and corrode and could eventually plug itself up with the corrosion.

== Standards ==
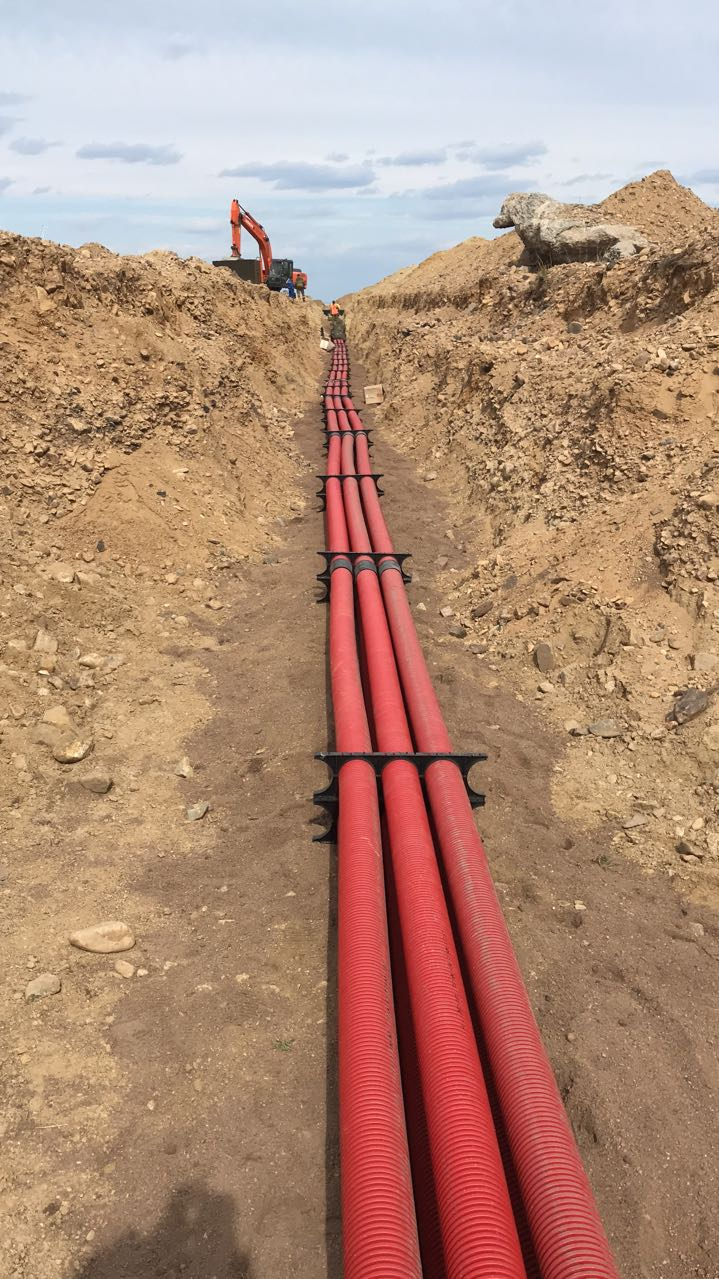
Stacking of a connected pipeline for transportation of oil products

There are certain standard codes that need to be followed while designing or manufacturing any piping system. Organizations that promulgate piping standards include:

- ASME – The American Society of Mechanical Engineers – B31 series
  - ASME B31.1 Power piping (steam piping etc.)
  - ASME B31.3 Process piping
  - ASME B31.4 Pipeline Transportation Systems for Liquid Hydrocarbons and Other Liquids and oil and gas
  - ASME B31.5 Refrigeration piping and heat transfer components
  - ASME B31.8 Gas transmission and distribution piping systems
  - ASME B31.9 Building services piping
  - ASME B31.11 Slurry Transportation Piping Systems (Withdrawn, Superseded by B31.4)
  - ASME B31.12 Hydrogen Piping and Pipelines
- ASTM – American Society for Testing and Materials
  - ASTM A53 Standard Specification for Pipe, Steel, Black and Hot-Dipped, Zinc-Coated, Welded and Seamless
  - ASTM A106 Standard Specification for Seamless Carbon Steel Pipe for High-Temperature Service
  - ASTM A213 Standard Specification for Seamless Ferritic and Austenitic Alloy-Steel Boiler, Superheater, and Heat-Exchanger Tubes
  - ASTM A252 Standard Specification for Welded and Seamless Steel Pipe Piles
  - ASTM A312 Standard Specification for Seamless, Welded, and Heavily Cold Worked Austenitic Stainless Steel Pipes
  - ASTM A333 Standard Specification for Seamless and Welded Steel Pipe for Low-Temperature Service
  - ASTM A335 Standard Specification for Seamless Ferritic Alloy-Steel Pipe for High-Temperature Service
- API – American Petroleum Institute
  - API 5L Petroleum and natural gas industries—Steel pipe for pipeline transportation systems
- CWB – Canadian Welding Bureau
- EN 13480 – European metallic industrial piping code
  - EN 13480-1 Metallic industrial piping – Part 1: General
  - EN 13480-2 Metallic industrial piping – Part 2: Materials
  - EN 13480-3 Metallic industrial piping – Part 3: Design and calculation
  - EN 13480-4 Metallic industrial piping – Part 4: Fabrication and installation
  - EN 13480-5 Metallic industrial piping – Part 5: Inspection and testing
  - EN 13480-6 Metallic industrial piping – Part 6: Additional requirements for buried piping
  - PD TR 13480-7 Metallic industrial piping – Part 7: Guidance on the use of conformity assessment procedures
  - EN 13480-8 Metallic industrial piping – Part 8: Additional requirements for aluminium and aluminium alloy piping
  - EN 13941 District heating pipes
- GOST, RD, SNiP, SP – Russian piping codes
  - RD 10-249 Power Piping
  - GOST 32388 Process Piping, HDPE Piping
  - SNiP 2.05.06-85 & SP 36.13330.2012 Gas and Oil transmission piping systems
  - GOST R 55990-2014 & SP 284.1325800.2016 Field pipelines
  - SP 33.13330.2012 Steel Pipelines
  - GOST R 55596-2013 District heating networks
- EN 1993-4-3 Eurocode 3 – Design of steel structures – Part 4-3: Pipelines
- AWS – American Welding Society
- AWWA – American Water Works Association
- MSS – Manufacturers' Standardization Society
- ANSI – American National Standards Institute
- NFPA – National Fire Protection Association
- EJMA – Expansion Joint Manufacturers Association

== See also ==
- Drainage
- Firestop
- Gasket
- HDPE pipe
- Hydraulic machinery
- Hydrogen piping
- Hydrostatic test
- MS Pipe, MS Tube
- Pipe Cutting
- Pipefitter
- Pipe network analysis
- Pipe marking
- Pipe support
- Piping and plumbing fitting
  - Coupling (piping)
  - Double-walled pipe
  - Elbow (piping)
  - Nipple (plumbing)
  - Pipe cap
  - Street elbow
  - Union (plumbing)
  - Valve
  - Victaulic
- Pipeline pre-commissioning
- Plastic pipework
- Plastic Pressure Pipe Systems
- Plumbing
- Riser clamp
- Thermal insulation
