= Leak detector =

Leak detector may refer to:

- Leak noise correlator
- Helium mass spectrometer
- Water detector
- Gas detector

== See also ==
- Water sensor
