= Double pipe =

A double pipe may be:

- Diaulos (instrument), in ancient Greece
- Double vertical bar (|| or ‖), in computing, chemistry, mathematics, music or poetry
  - Lateral click (ǁ), in phonetics
- Double-walled pipe, in engineering
