= Correlator =

Correlator may refer to:

- Correlation function (quantum field theory)
- An optical correlator
- A radio correlator
- An apparatus for measuring second-order correlation function of electromagnetic field
- A leak noise correlator
- A correlation function (probability)

== See also ==
- Cross-correlation
