= Double-walled pipe =

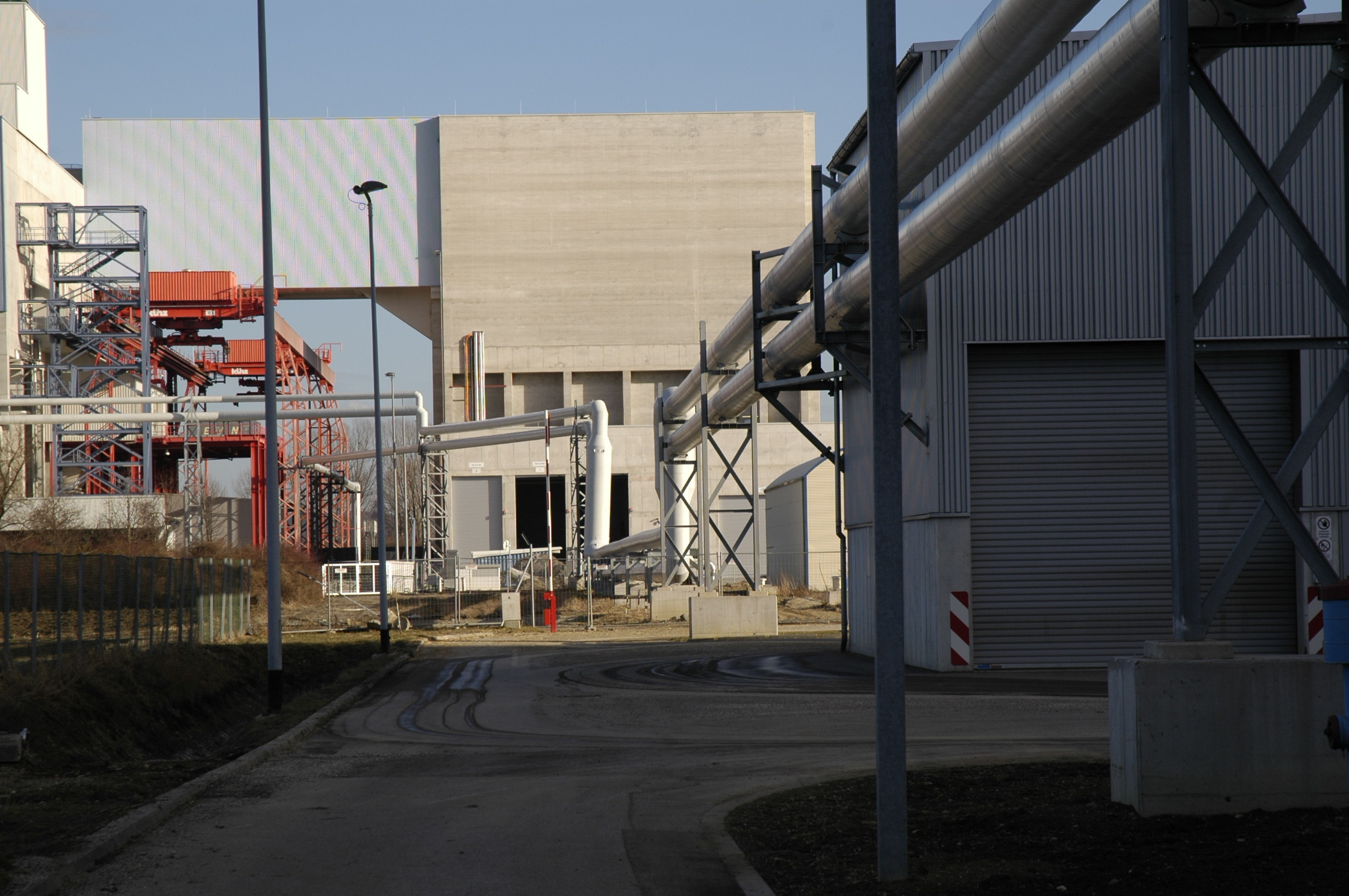
Pipelines with various types of pipe supports at the Dürnrohr power plant.

A double-walled pipe is a secondary contained piping system. It is a pipe within a pipe, or encased in an outer covering, with an annulus (interstitial space) between the two diameters. The inner pipe is the primary or carrier pipe and the outer pipe is called the secondary or containment pipe. The great majority of double-walled piping applications involve wastewater, groundwater, and process safety.

== Regulation ==
United States Environmental Protection Agency (EPA) standards, published in 40 CFR Parts 280 and 281, mandate double-walled piping for many below-ground transport systems in wastewater treatment plants and at sanitary or hazardous-waste landfills or remediation sites. These and other regulations affect below-grade transport of hazardous materials in fuel storage systems, tank farms, drainage or runoff from process plants, and some food processing and related applications. Double-walled containment systems are also used for certain classes of toxic or corrosive chemicals, mostly gases, used in semiconductor device fabrication. Double-walled pipes may also be used where a wastewater pipe traverses a drinking water catchment area.

== Materials ==
Double-walled pipe system may use plastic pressure pipe systems materials of high-density polyethylene (HDPE), polyvinyl chloride (PVC), chlorinated polyvinyl chloride (CPVC), polypropylene (PP), polyvinylidene fluoride (PVDF), and ethylene chlorotrifluoroethylene copolymer (ECTFE). Dual-wall stainless steel tubing is most commonly used in semiconductor plants for the containment of highly toxic gases.

A leak detection system in the containment pipe indicates if the carrier pipe is leaking. Double wall pipes are usually hydrostatically tested, or tested to hold and maintain a target gas pressure before the first use.

A different special application of a double-walled pipe is a jacketed pipe, which is used to make high viscosity liquids flow at elevated temperature through the carrier pipe. The outer pipe circulates hot fluids that heat up the interior carrier pipe and its contents in turn.

== See also ==
- Minor losses in pipe flow
