= Helium mass spectrometer =

Helium leak detection instrument

A helium mass spectrometer or helium leak detector are unique instruments commonly used to detect and locate small leaks. The helium leak detector was initially developed in the Manhattan Project during World War II to find extremely small leaks in the gas diffusion process of uranium enrichment plants. Typically, the test method uses a vacuum chamber, at vacuum pressures typically less than 100mTorr, in which a helium pressurized system under test is placed. Helium leaks out of the system under test, with the rate of leakage detected by an optimal ion source mass spectrometer or leak detector.

== Detection technique ==
Helium is used as a tracer because it penetrates small leaks rapidly. Helium also has the properties of being non-toxic, chemically inert and present in the atmosphere only in minute quantities (<6 ppm). Typically a helium leak detector will be used to measure leaks in the range of 10^{−5} to 10^{−12} Pa·m^{3}·s^{−1}. When a mass spectrometer is used to sample the leaking helium leaks can be detected up to 10^{−14} Pa·m^{3}·s^{−1}.

A flow of 10^{−5} Pa·m^{3}·s^{−1} is about 0.006 ml per minute at standard conditions for temperature and pressure (STP).

A flow of 10^{−13} Pa·m^{3}·s^{−1} is about 0.003 ml per century at STP.

== Types of leaks ==
Helium, when used as a tracer for leaks, can identify two leak types:

- A real/residual leak is due to an imperfect seal, a puncture, or some other hole in the system being tested.
- A virtual leak resembles a real leak but is caused by outgassing of chemicals trapped or adhered to the interior of the sealed system being tested. As the gases are released into the chamber, they can create a false positive indication of a real leak.

== Uses ==
Helium mass spectrometer leak detectors are used in production line industries such as refrigeration and air conditioning, automotive parts, carbonated beverage containers food packages and aerosol packaging, as well as in the manufacture of steam products, gas bottles, fire extinguishers, tire valves, heat exchangers and numerous other products including all vacuum systems.

== Test methods ==
=== Global helium spray ===
This method requires the part to be tested to be connected to a helium leak detector. The outer surface of the part to be tested will be located in some kind of a tent in which the helium concentration will be raised to 100% helium.

If the part is small the vacuum system included in the leak testing instrument will be able to within a short amount of time reach low enough pressure (typically below 100mTorr) to allow for mass spectrometer operation.

If the size of the part is too large, an additional vacuum pumping system may be required to reach low enough pressure in a reasonable length of time. Once operating pressure has been reached, the mass spectrometer can start its measuring operation.

If leakage is encountered the small and "agile" molecules of helium will migrate through the cracks into the part. The vacuum system will carry any tracer gas molecule into the analyzer cell of the magnetic sector mass spectrometer. A signal will inform the operator of the value of the leakage encountered.

=== Local helium spray ===
This method is a small variation from the one above. It still requires the part to be tested to be connected to a helium leak detector and all steps above and vacuum pump sizing based on the part size are followed. However, the outer surface of the part to be tested is sprayed with a localized stream of helium tracer gas where the spray head will be moved across the part. Thus, correlation between maximum leakage signal and helium spray head location will allow the operator to pinpoint the leaky area for possible repair or further investigation.

=== Helium charged vacuum test ===
In this test method, the part is pressurized with helium, or a helium and hydrogen mixture to reduce cost, while sitting in a vacuum chamber. The vacuum chamber is connected to a vacuum pumping system and a leak detector. Once the vacuum has reached the leak detector operating pressure, any helium leakage will be measured. Sometimes after leak testing concludes, a burst test, i.e. at 40 bar may be conducted in the same chamber.

This test method may be optimal for certain components: airbag canisters, evaporators, condensers, high-voltage filled SF_{6} switchgear, as pressures during testing may simulate those seen in component application, along with positioning any seals, gaskets, etc. into their operating position during testing.

=== Partial vacuum method (ultra sniffer test) ===
In contrast to the Helium charged vacuum test, the partial vacuum method, the ultra sniffer test gas method (UST-method) uses a partial vacuum effect, so that gas tightness of the test sample can be detected at normal pressure with the same sensitivity as the helium charged vacuum test with helium gas helium. The method has a sensitivity of 10^{−12} Pa·m^{3}·s^{−1}. Similar to the classical Helium charged sniffer test the test sample is enclosed in a bag, but in contrast to the classic method, the bag is exposed with a helium-free gas, so that the helium concentration inside the bag can reduced from 5·10^{−7} to 10^{−12} Pa·m^{3}·s^{−1}. This sensitivity corresponds to a theoretical gas loss of 1 cm^{3} in 3000 years.

The UST method can be used very economically for the ad hoc testing of test samples. The test system can be set up easily, with normal pneumatic items, such as valves and plastic hoses. For the embedding of the test samples, a simple plastic bag is sufficient. The UST method was also used for the leak testing of component of the fusion experiment Wendelstein 7-X in Germany.

=== Helium charged sniffer test ===
In this case the part is pressurized with helium. The mass spectrometer is fitted with a special device, a sniffer probe usually mounted near the location of expected leak points, that allows the sniffer probe to sample air (and tracer gas when confronted with a leak) at atmospheric pressure and to bring it into the mass spectrometer.

This mode of operation is frequently used to locate a leak that has been detected by other methods, in order to allow for parts repair at the detected leak points. Modern machines can digitally remove the helium 20 times below the background level and thus it is now possible detect leaks as small as 5·10^{−10} Pa·m^{3}·s^{−1} in sniffing mode.

=== Bombing test ===
This method applies to objects that are supposedly hermetically sealed such as implantable medical devices, crystal oscillator, saw filter devices, transistors, microprocessors, etc. First the device under test will be exposed to helium pressure (typically 30-60psi) in a "bombing" chamber for an extended time period. If the part is leaky, helium will be able to penetrate the device.

Later the device will be placed in a vacuum chamber, connected to a vacuum pump and a mass spectrometer. The tiny amount of gas that entered the device under pressure will be released in the vacuum chamber and sent to the mass spectrometer where the leak rate will be measured down to 10^{−9} mbar·L·s^{−1}.

This method is not able to detect a massive leak as the tracer gas will be quickly pumped out when test chamber is pumped down.

== See also ==
- Mass spectrometry
- Tracer-gas leak testing
- Leak noise correlator
- Helium analyzer
