= ROHR2 =

Pipe stress analysis software

- Developer: SIGMA Ingenieurgesellschaft mbH
- Stable release: 34.1
- Written in: C++, C#, Fortran,
- Operating system: Windows
- Available in: English, German, French
- Website: www.rohr2.com

ROHR2 is a CAE system for pipe stress analysis from SIGMA Ingenieurgesellschaft mbH, based in Unna, Germany. The software performs both static and dynamic analysis of complex piping and skeletal structures, and runs on Microsoft Windows platform.

ROHR2 software comes with built-in industry standard stress codes; such as ASME B31.1, B31.3, B31.4, B31.5, B31.8, EN 13480, CODETI; along with several GRP pipe codes; as well as nuclear stress codes such as ASME Cl. 1-3, KTA 3201.2, KTA 3211.2.

== Name ==
The brand name comes from the German word "Rohr" (pronounced "ROAR") which means "pipe".

== History ==
=== Early years as a MBP product: 1960's to 1989 ===
ROHR2 was created in the late 1960s by one of the first software companies in Germany, Mathematischer Beratungs- und Programmierungsdienst (MBP), based in Dortmund. ROHR2 first ran on mainframes such as UNIVAC 1, CRAY, and later Prime computer. At the time, the program was command line driven with a proprietary programming language to describe the piping systems and define the various load conditions. The 1987 launched version 26 was released for IBM PC and IBM PC compatible systems.

=== As a EDS / SIGMA product: 1989 to 2000 ===
MBP was later taken over by EDS (then a part of General Motors Corp., now part of HP Enterprise Services). In 1989, SIGMA Ingenieurgesellschaft mbH was founded in Dortmund, and the ROHR2 development and support team moved to the new office premises of SIGMA. The graphical user interface was added in 1994 to the product, which allowed the editing of piping systems without the need of mastering the earlier required programming language.

=== Sigma Ingenieurgesellschaft mbH product: 2000 to present ===
From the year 2000 onwards, the complete licensing and sales activities came under the management of SIGMA Ingenieurgesellschaft mbH; which by then evolved into an engineering company specializing in pipe engineering, as well as a software development firm.

The recent developments include new bi-directional interfaces based on open standards for transfer of data with other CAD/CAE products such as AVEVA PDMS, CADISON, Intergraph's PDS, Intergraph's SmartPlant, HICAD, MPDS4, Bentley System's AutoPLANT, Autodesk's PLANT3D and other PCF supported software. The integration of ROHR2 into the users workflow is supported by third-party interface products to ensure interoperability - a norm in the present engineering software industry.

== Software packages ==
The ROHR2 program system comes with the graphical user interface ROHR2win, the calculation core ROHR2, and various additional programs, see section related products.

== Calculation basics ==
The static analysis includes the calculation of static loads of any value, or combination in accordance with the theories of first- and second order for linear and non-linear boundary conditions (friction, support lift).

Additional load conditions can also be applied, such as dynamic loads or harmonic excitation. Furthermore, the dynamic analysis include the calculation of eigenvalues and mode shapes as well as their processing in various modal response methods - for the analysis of f.i. earthquakes and fluid hammer.

A non-linear time history module (ROHR2stoss) allows the analysis of dynamic events in the time domain, while taking into account non-linear components such as snubbers or visco dampers based on the Maxwell model. An efficient superposition module enables a manifold selection and combination of static and dynamic results.

== Related products ==
- ROHR2fesu - Finite element analysis of substructures in ROHR2
- ROHR2iso - Creation of isometric drawings in ROHR2
- ROHR2stoss - Structural analysis with dynamic loads using direct integration
- ROHR2nozzle - Analysis of nozzles in piping systems according to API 610, 617, 661, NEMA SM23, DIN EN ISO 5199, 9905, 10437 and others
- ROHR2press - Internal pressure analysis of piping components
- SINETZ - Steady state calculation of flow distribution, pressure drop and heat loss in branched and intermeshed piping networks for compressible and incompressible media
- SINETZfluid - Calculation of flow distribution and pressure drop of incompressible media in branched and intermeshed piping networks
- PROBAD - Code-based strength calculations of pressure parts

== See also ==
- Pipe stress analysis
