= Leak =

Method of fluid escaping containment

A leak is a way (usually an opening) for fluid to escape a container or fluid-containing system, such as a tank or a ship's hull, through which the contents of the container can escape or outside matter can enter the container. Leaks are usually unintended and therefore undesired. The word leak usually refers to a gradual loss; a sudden loss is usually called a spill.

The matter leaking in or out can be gas, liquid, a highly viscous paste, or even a fluidized solid such as a powdered or granular solid or other solid particles.

== Types ==
Water leakage

Types of leak openings include a puncture, gash, rust or other corrosion hole, very tiny "pinhole leak" (possibly in imperfect welds), crack or microcrack, or inadequate sealing between components or parts joined. When there is a puncture, the size and shape of the leak can often be seen, but in many other cases, the size and shape of the leak opening may not be so obvious. In many cases, the location of a leak can be determined by seeing material drip out at a certain place, although the leak opening itself is not obvious. In some cases, it may be known or suspected there is a leak, but even the location of the leak is not known. Since leak openings are often irregular shapes or extended cracks, leaks are sometimes sized by the leakage rate, as in volume of fluid leaked per time, rather than the size of the opening.

Common types of leaks for many people include leaks in vehicle tires, which allows air to leak out and results in flat tires, and leaks in containers, which spills the contents. Leaks can occur or develop in many different kinds of household, building, vehicle, marine, aircraft, or industrial fluid systems, whether the fluid is a gas or liquid. Leaks in vehicle hydraulic systems such as brake or power steering lines could cause loss of brake or power steering fluid, resulting in failure of the brakes, power steering, or other hydraulic system. Also possible are leaks of engine coolant—particularly in the radiator and at the water pump seal, transmission fluid, motor oil, and refrigerant in the air conditioning system. Some of these vehicle fluids have different colors to help identify the type of leaking fluid.

Batteries are at risk of leakage, because their operation inherently involves chemical corrosion. A zinc-carbon battery is an example of a commonly-seen leaking component; the electrolytes inside the cell sometimes leak out of the cell casing and cause damage to an electronic appliance.

Water leaks occur when there is damage to the water supply system or wastewater system that causes water to release. For water suppliers, leakage is defined as the amount of water that enters the supply system but is not ultimately provided to customers.

Gas leaks, e.g. in natural gas lines allow flammable and potentially explosive gas to leak out, resulting in a hazardous situation. Leaks of refrigerant may occur in refrigerators or air conditioning systems.

Some industrial plants, especially chemical and power plants, have numerous fluid systems containing many types of liquid or gaseous chemicals, sometimes at high temperature and/or pressure. An example of a possible industrial location of a leak between two fluid systems is a leak between the shell and tube sides in a heat exchanger, potentially contaminating either or both fluid systems with the other fluid. A system holding a full or partial vacuum may have a leak causing inleakage of air from the outside. Leakage of even small jets of superheated steam can be extremely dangerous because of the high temperatures and large amounts of energy released within confined spaces.

Hazmat procedures and/or teams may become involved when leakage or spillage of hazardous materials occurs. Leaks while transporting hazardous materials could result in danger; for example, when accidents occur.

Leakage of air or other gas out of hot air balloons or dirigibles, can be dangerous. Leakage from pressurized cabins of airplanes or spacecraft can cause breathing difficulties to the occupants.

Low-pressure chronic leaks of air, rainwater, or melting snow are a common problem in architecture, affecting residential, commercial, and industrial structures. Very small openings in roof or wall cladding can admit large amounts of water over time, especially if wind-driven by storms. Because water can travel long distances horizontally due to surface tension and capillary action, it can migrate to places far removed from the original ingress location. Electronic Leak Detection (ELD) may be required to find elusive pinhole or hidden seam leaks. Because leaks can cause water damage and extensive growth of mold, major lawsuits among building tenants, owners, builders, architects, consultants, and suppliers can ensue. During the design phase, considerable effort is often devoted to prevention of air and water leaks through building envelopes, sometimes including full-scale mockups subjected to testing in specialized wind tunnels.

A leak can occur inside a living body, such as a hole in the septum between heart ventricles. Major leaks of blood, known as aneurisms, can cause sudden unexpected death, if not immediately treated.

== Causes ==
There can be numerous causes of leaks. Leaks can occur from the outset even during construction or initial manufacture/assembly of fluid systems. Pipes, tubing, valves, fittings, or other components may be improperly joined or welded together. Components with threads may be improperly screwed together. Leaks can be caused by damage; for example, punctures or fracture. Often leaks are the result of deterioration of materials from wear or aging, such as rusting or other corrosion or decomposition of elastomers or similar polymer materials used as gaskets or other seals. For example, wearing out of faucet washers causes water to leak at the faucets.

Cracks may result from either outright damage, or wearing out by stress such as fatigue failure from pressure cycling, or corrosion such as stress corrosion cracking. Wearing out of a surface between a disk and its seat in a valve could cause a leak between ports (valve inlets or outlets). Wearing out of packing around a turning valve stem or rotating centrifugal pump shaft could develop into fluid outleakage into the environment. For some frequently-operating centrifugal pumps, such leakage is so expected that provisions are made for carrying away or bleeding off the leakage. Similarly, wearing out of seals or packing around piston-driven pumps could also develop into outleakage to the environment.

The pressure difference between both sides of the leak can affect the movement of material through the leak. Fluids will commonly move from the higher pressure side to the lower pressure side. The larger the pressure difference, the more leakage there will typically be. The fluid pressures on both sides include the hydrostatic pressure, which is pressure due to the weight from the height of fluid level above the leak. When the pressures are about equal, there can be an exchange of fluids between both sides, or little to no net movement of fluid across the leak.

== Testing ==
A technician uses an acoustic leak detector (sound amplifier) to identify the pipeline leak location

Containers, vessels, enclosures, or other fluid system are sometimes tested for leaks - to see if there is any leakage and to find where the leaks are so corrective action can be taken. There are several methods for leak testing, depending on the situation. Sometimes leakage of fluid may make a sound which can be detected. Tires, engine radiators, and maybe some other smaller vessels may be tested by pressurizing them with air and submerging them in water to see where air bubbles come out to indicate a leak.

If submerging in water is not possible, then pressurization with air followed by covering the area to be tested with a soap solution is done to see if soap bubbles form, which indicate a leak. Other types of testing for gas leaks may involve testing for the outleaking gases with sensors which can detect that gas, for example - special sensing instruments for detecting natural gas. US federal safety law now requires natural gas companies to conduct testing for gas leaks upstream of their customer's gas meters. Where liquids are used, special color dyes may be added to help see the leakage. Other detectable substances in one of the liquids may be tested, such as saline to find a leak in a sea water system, or detectable substances may even be deliberately added to test for leakage.

Newly constructed, fabricated, or repaired systems or other vessels are sometimes tested to verify satisfactory production or repair. Plumbers often test for leaks after working on a water or other fluid system. A vessel or system is sometimes pressure tested by filling with air and the pressure monitored to see if it drops, indicating a leak.

A very commonly used test after new construction or repair is a hydrostatic test, sometimes called a pressure test. In a hydrostatic test, a system is pressurized with water to look for a drop in pressure or to see where it leaks out. Helium testing may be done to detect for any very small leakage such as when testing certain diaphragm or bellows valves, made for high purity and utra high purity service, requiring low leak rate capability. Helium and hydrogen have very small molecules which can go through very small leaks. Because of the hazardous conditions caused by leaks, hydrogen leak testing has become a specialized service.

Leak testing is part of the non-destructive test NDT portfolio that can be applied to a part to verify its conformity; depending on material, pressure, leak tightness specifications, different methods can be applied. International standards has been defined to assist in these choices. For example, BS EN 1779:1999; it applies to assessment of leak tightness by indication or measurement of gas leakage, but excludes hydrostatic, ultrasonic or electromagnetic methods. Other standards also apply:

- BS EN 13184:2001 Non-destructive testing. Leak testing. Pressure change
- BS EN 13185:2001 Non-destructive testing. Leak testing. Tracer gas method
- BS EN 13192:2002 Non-destructive testing. Leak testing. Calibration of reference leaks for gases

In shell and tube heat exchangers, eddy current testing is sometimes done in the tubes to find locations on tubes where there may be leaks or damage which may eventually develop into a leak.

== Corrective action ==
Leakage in plants can result in inefficiency. In complex plants with multiple fluid systems, many interconnecting units holding fluids have isolation valves between them.

Leaks are often repaired by plugging the leaking holes or using a patch to cover them. Leaking tires are often fixed this way. Leaking gaskets, seals, washers, or packing can be replaced. Use of welding, soldering, sealing, or gluing may be other ways to fix leaks. Sometimes, the most practical solution is to replace the leaking unit. Leaking water heaters are often replaced by home or building owners.

If there is a leak in one of the tubes of a shell and tube heat exchanger, that tube can be plugged at both ends with specially sized plugs to isolate the leak. This is done in the plenum(s) at the points where the tube ends connect to the tubesheet(s). Sometimes a damaged but not yet leaking tube is pre-emptively plugged to prevent future leakage. The heat transfer capacity of that tube is lost, but there are usually plenty of other tubes to pick up the heat transfer load.

== See also ==
- Explosion
- Fugitive emissions
- Non-revenue water
- Seal (mechanical)
