= Pipe marking =

Type of identification

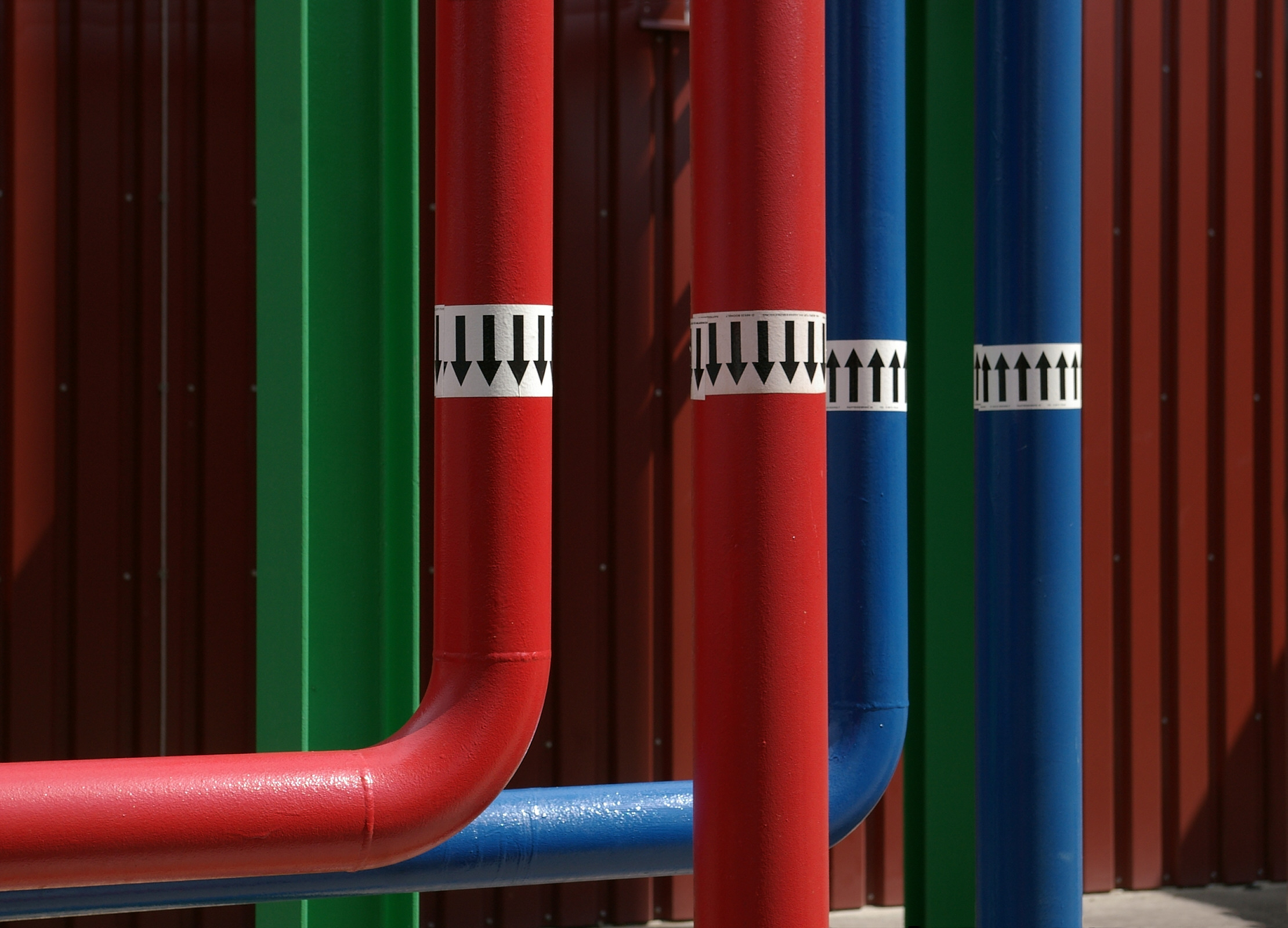
Example of pipe marking through colors and symbols (arrows) to indicated pipe contents (colors) and flow direction (arrows).

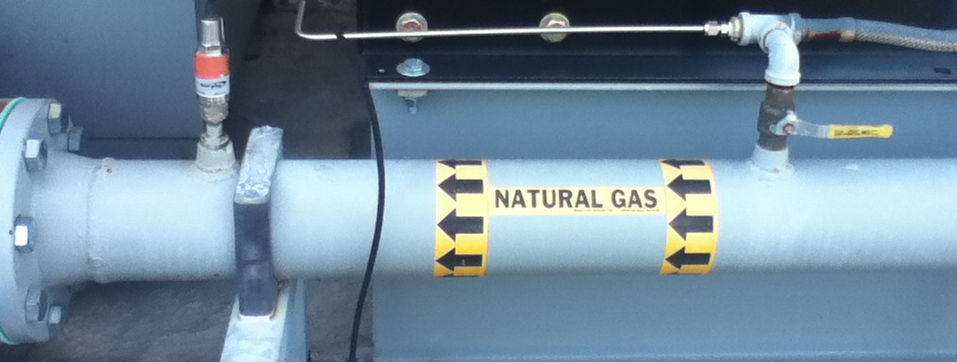
Pipe marking on a natural gas pipe

In the process industry, chemical industry, manufacturing industry, and other commercial and industrial contexts, pipe marking is used to identify the contents, properties and flow direction of fluids in piping. It is typically carried out by marking piping through labels and color codes. Pipe marking helps personnel and fire response teams identify the correct pipes for operational, maintenance or emergency response purposes.

== Background ==
Pipes are used extensively in commercial and industrial buildings and on industrial plant (e.g. oil refineries) to transfer fluids between items of plant and equipment. Positive identification assists operations personnel to correctly identify plant when carrying out routine or maintenance activities, and for emergency personnel when responding to emergencies. Pipe marking is particularly important for identification where pipes run along pipe racks, through walls and bulkheads and through floors.

A range of corporate, national and international codes, standards and regulations are in use around the world.

== National standards: United States ==
=== ANSI/ASME Standards ===
Three ASME A13.1 pipe markers.

In the United States, Occupational Safety and Health Administration regulations recommend following American Society of Mechanical Engineers Standard A13.1-2015 - Scheme for the Identification of Piping Systems.

The standard states that labels should be placed where easily viewed by a person standing near the pipe at any of the following points:

- Valves and flanges.
- Approximately every 25 feet (7.6 m) to 50 feet (15 m) on straight sections.
- A pipe passes through a wall or floor.
- Any pipe direction changes, such bends or junctions.

A13.1-1996
| Meaning | Background Color | Text Color | Example |
|---|---|---|---|
| Hazardous materials (Note: Explosives, flammables, corrosives, toxic, radioactive, extreme pressures/temperatures.) | Safety Yellow | Black | Acetylene |
| Non-hazardous liquids | Safety Green | White | Stormwater |
| Non-hazardous gases | Safety Blue | White | Nitrogen |
| Firefighting materials | Safety Red | White | Sprinkler Water |

A13.1-2007/2015
| Meaning | Background Color | Text Color | Example |
|---|---|---|---|
| Flammables (Note: Flash point below 100 °F (38 °C; 311 K).) & Oxidizers (Note: Oxidizers were added in 2015 update.) | Safety Yellow | Black | Acetylene |
| Combustible Fluids (Note: Fluids that can burn, but are not considered 'flammable', flash point at or above 100 °F (38 °C; 311 K).) | Safety Brown | White | Lubricating Oil |
| Toxic and Corrosives | Safety Orange | White | Ammonia |
| Water | Safety Green | White | Stormwater |
| Compressed air/Non-hazardous gases | Safety Blue | White | Compressed Air |
| Firefighting materials | Safety Red | White | Sprinkler Water |
| Custom - Defined by user | Safety Purple | White | Fluid Name |
| Custom - Defined by user | Safety Grey | White | Fluid Name |
| Custom - Defined by user | White | Black | Fluid Name |
| Custom - Defined by user | Black | White | Fluid Name |

=== 2015 revisions ===
A 2015 style pipe marker with GHS signal word and symbols.

2015 revisions added oxidizing materials to the existing 'Flammables' classification. The other major change allowed and encouraged labels to incorporate the GHS signal word, hazard pictograms, and hazard statements. This addition helped identify additional dangers when dealing with materials that fit into multiple categories, like hydrogen sulfide, which is both flammable and toxic.

=== IIAR Bulletin #114 ===
IIAR Bulletin 114 pipe marker for a low-temperature recirculated suction (LTRS) line, where both liquid and vapor are present

In 2014, the International Institute of Ammonia Refrigeration introduced a specialized label design for use when marking pipes associated with refrigeration systems using ammonia, including information such as the physical state, pressure and purpose in the system.

=== NFPA 99C 2002 ===
The National Fire Protection Association have a special labeling system in the standard for Health Care Facilities, such as hospitals and dentistry offices. This standard puts more emphasis on gases found in Medical gas supply systems, which consist of both oxidizing gases and gases that displace oxygen.

| Gas | Background Color | Text Color |
|---|---|---|
| Carbon Dioxide | Gray | Black or White |
| Helium | Brown | White |
| Medical Air | Yellow | Black |
| Oxygen | Green | White (Note: Background & Text color can be reversed.) |
| Oxygen/Carbon Mixtures | Green | White |
| Nitrogen | Black | White |
| Nitrous Oxide | Blue | White |
| Waste Anesthetic Gas Disposal | Purple | White |
| Medical Surgical Vacuum | White | Black |
| Non-Medical Air | Yellow/White Diagonal Striped | Black |
| Non-medical and Level 3 Vacuum | Black/White Diagonal Striped | Black (In box) |
| Laboratory Air | Yellow/White Checkerboard | Black |
| Laboratory Vacuum | Black/White Checkerboard | Black (In box) |
| Instrument Air | Red | White |

== National standards: United Kingdom ==
In the United Kingdom there are three principal regulations that mandate the marking of equipment and piping:

- Classification, Labelling and Packaging of Chemicals (Amendments to Secondary Legislation) Regulations 2015,
- Health and Safety (Safety Signs and Signals) Regulations 1996,
- Provision and Use of Work Equipment Regulations 1998,

The regulations require that vessels containing hazardous substances together with the pipes containing or transporting such substances must be labelled or marked with the relevant hazard pictograms or pipe marking. The labels used on pipes must be positioned visibly in the vicinity of the most hazardous points, such as valves and joints; at both sides of bulkheads and floor penetrations; and at reasonable intervals.

The regulations do not specify a specific marking system, but BS EN ISO 1710 Graphical symbols — Safety colours and safety signs is often used.

=== BS 1710 Safety colours and signs ===
A widely used British Standard (BS) for marking equipment is:

- BS 1710:2019 Graphical symbols — Safety colours and safety signs — Registered safety signs

The Standard stipulates the colours to be used. These are as follows:

BS 1710 Basic identification colours for pipes
| Contents | Colour | BS 4800 colour |
|---|---|---|
| Water | Green | 12 D 45 |
| Steam | Silver-grey | 10 A 03 |
| Oils | Brown | 06 C 39 |
| Gases | Yellow Ochre | 08 C 35 |
| Acids and Alkalis | Violet | 22 C 37 |
| Air | Light Blue | 20 E 51 |
| Other liquids | Black | 00 E 53 |
| Electrical & Ventilation | Orange | 06 E 51 |

In addition to the basic colours, certain safety colours are used:

BS 1710 Safety colours for pipes
| Safety service | Colour | BS 4800 colour |
|---|---|---|
| Fire fighting | Red | 04 E 53 |
| Warning | Yellow | 08 E 51 |
| Fresh water | Auxiliary Blue | 18 E 53 |
| User defined | User defined | |

The arrangement of markings is for the safety colour to be between bands of the basic colour.

Firewater service would be:

Basic marking of firewater piping in accordance with BS EN ISO 7010

The pipe contents must be identified adjacent to the banding. This can be done by giving either:

- The full name
- Abbreviation
- Chemical symbol
- Refrigerant number
- Coloured bands (user specified)

The direction of flow should also be identified near the banding.

Examples using this system are as shown.

Examples of pipe marking using BS 7010

== National standards: India ==
=== IS 2379 Pipelines Identification Colour Code ===
The Indian Standard IS 2379 provides for a ground colour and a coloured band on piping to identify material.

IS 2379 ground colours
| Substance | Ground colour |
|---|---|
| Water | Sea green |
| Steam | Aluminium |
| Oils and combustible liquid | Light brown |
| Acids | Dark violet |
| Air | Sky blue |
| Gases | Canary yellow |
| Alkalise | Smoke grey |
| Other gases and liquids | Black |
| Hydrocarbons/organic compounds | Dark aluminium grey |

Colour bands of 25 mm to 100 mm width are placed at locations such as battery limits, intersections, near valves, at walls, starting and terminating points. There is a large range of bands which define the contents of the line. For example, for oils.

IS 2379 Oil colours
| Substance | Ground colour | Band colour |
|---|---|---|
| Light diesel | Light brown | Brilliant green |
| High speed diesel | Light brown | None |
| Paraffin oil | Light brown | Signal red |
| Quenching oil | Light brown | Canary yellow |
| Furnace fuel | Light brown | French blue |
| Lubricating oil | Light brown | Light grey |
| Hydraulic power | Light brown | Dark violet |
| Transformer oil | Light brown | Light orange |

== National standards: Australia ==
Pipes, ducts and conduits are identification by the Australian Standard AS 1345—1995 “Identification of the contents of pipes, conduits and ducts”

Australian Standard AS 1345
| Service | AS 2700 Colour |
|---|---|
| Water | G21 Jade |
| Steam | N24 Silver Grey |
| Oils, flammable liquids | X53 Golden Tan |
| Gases | Y44 Sand |
| Acids & alkalis | P23 Lilac |
| Air | B25 Aqua |
| Other Liquids | N61 Black |
| Fire Services | R13 Signal Red |
| Electric Power | X15 Orange |
| Communication | N14 White |
| Dangerous Materials | Y14 Golden Yellow + N61 Black |

== International standards ==
=== ISO 14726 Ships and marine facilities ===
Ships and marine facilities must conform to an international standard for piping systems identification. This is ISO 14726:2008 Ships and marine technology — Identification colours for the content of piping systems.

This is a two-colour banded marking system. The main colour shows what the fluid is being used for. This is on either side of the secondary colour which indicates what the substance actually is. The main colours are as follows:

- Black - Waste media
- Blue - Fresh water
- Brown - Fuel
- Green – Sea water
- Grey - Non-flammable gases
- Maroon - Air and sounding pipes
- Orange - Oils other than fuels
- Silver - Steam
- Red - Fire fighting
- Violet - Acids, alkalis
- White - Air in ventilation systems
- Yellow - Flammable gases

=== ISO 20560-1 & -2 Safety information for piping systems ===
International Standard ISO 20560-1:2020 Safety information for the content of piping systems and tanks — Part 1: Piping systems was intended to replace the variety of regulations and standards across countries and regions. Basic identification colours and warning symbols identify the pipe contents and any hazards.

Pipe markers consists of 4 basic elements:

- Basic identification (background) colour, see table below, e.g. yellow for hazardous substance
- Name of the substance/content, e.g. NATURAL GAS
- Flow direction indicator arrows, ⇒
- Warning symbols, e.g. GHS symbol

GHS pictogram for a flammable substance

Colours and substances are typically as follows:

ISO 20560-1:2020 Colours and substances
| Substance | Background colour | Text colour |
|---|---|---|
| Hazardous substances | Yellow | Black |
| Gas (liquid or gaseous) | Grey | Black |
| Liquids & solids (powder/granulate) | Black | White |
| Acids | Orange | Black |
| Alkalis | Violet | White |
| Fire fighting medium | Red | White |
| Water | Green | White |
| Air | Blue | White |

International Standard ISO 20560-2 Safety information for the content of piping systems and tanks — Part 2: Tanks, provides a similar colour scheme for tanks.

== European standards: RAL Colours ==
RAL colour standard charts are used by architects, construction industry and road safety.

The pipe identification colours are as shown in the table.

Pipe Identification Colours
| Type | Reference | RAL Colour Code | Colour |
|---|---|---|---|
| Steam | 2114 | 9006 | White aluminium |
| Air | 2123 | 5012 | Light blue |
| Water | 2138 | 6010 | Grass green |
| Gas | 2149 | 1004 | Golden yellow |
| Acid | 2163 | 4001 | Red lilac |
| Liquid Spirits | 2173 | 8001 | Ochre brown |
| Other Liquids | 2179 | 9005 | Jet black |

== See also ==
- Piping
- American National Standards Institute
- American Society of Mechanical Engineers
