= Tracer-gas leak testing =

Nondestructive testing method for detecting gas leaks

A tracer-gas leak testing method is a nondestructive testing method that detects gas leaks. A variety of methods with different sensitivities exist. Tracer-gas leak testing is used in the petrochemical industry, the automotive industry, the construction industry and in the manufacture of semiconductors, among other uses.

== Types ==
Several tracer-gas leak testing methods exist, including:

- Detection of leaks using helium mass spectrometer, which provides high sensitivity
- Hydrogen leak testing, which provides the best mobility
- Refrigerant gas leak detection, for refrigeration applications

== Method selection ==
=== Typical leakage rates ===
The nature of the product or the process and the process gases will set the leak rate requirement:

System	Allowed leak rate (mbar L/s)
Chemical process equipment	10^{−1}–1
Beverage can	10^{−5} –10^{−6}
Vacuum pumped system	10^{−5}–10^{−7}
IC-package	10^{−7}–10^{−8}
Airbag cartridge	10^{−8}
Pacemaker	10^{−9}
Closed vacuum system	10^{−9}

=== Sensitivity of methods ===
Based on the target leak rate, the table below will help to choose the most suitable method.

Method	Sensitivity (leak rate in mbar l/s)
Ultrasonics	10^{−1}
Bubble test in water	10^{−2}
Pressure decay	10^{−2}
Vacuum decay	10^{−2}
Acoustic emission detectors	10^{−3}
Bubble test in soapy water	10^{−4}
Gas-specific thermal conductivity detector	10^{−5}
Halogen detector	10^{−5}
Photoacoustic spectroscopy	10^{−6}
Hydrogen sniffer	10^{−6}
Residual gas analyser	10^{−7}
Dye penetrant	10^{−8}
Radioactive tracer	10^{−10}
Helium mass spectrometry vacuum testing	10^{−11}

== Applications ==
Typical applications of tracer-gas leak testing include:

- In petrochemical plants, hydrocracking, vapocracking, catalytic reforming, and steam reforming are all hydrogen-based processes, in which were hydrogen leak testing is required.
- When manufacturing semiconductors, all processes taking place in a process chamber at atmospheric pressure or under vacuum – diffusion, oxidation, LPCVD, PECVD, PVD and ion implantation – require helium or hydrogen leak testing.
- In vehicles, airbags have to be tested for leaks so they remain functional for a long time. As well as airbags, the air conditioning system, fuel system, and exhaust system require testing for leaks.
- Pacemakers and catheters have to be tested for efficacy and longevity.
- On planes, tracer-gas leak testing is used to quickly and safely locate fuel leaks, as well as to check oxygen distribution devices and cabin pressurization systems.
- Refrigeration and air conditioning must have the lowest possible rate of loss of refrigerant gases (contributing to ozone depletion).
- Sewage and drinking water networks, to reduce loss of water and make sure drinking water is not contaminated by sewage.

== Standards ==
Several standards apply to leak testing and more specifically to tracer-gas leak testing methods, for example:

- BS EN 1779:1999; leak tightness by indication or measurement of gas leakage,
- BS EN 13185:2001 Non-destructive testing. Leak testing. Tracer gas method,
- BS EN 13192:2002 Non-destructive testing. Leak testing. Calibration of reference leaks for gases.
