= Pipeline pre-commissioning =

Pipeline pre-commissioning is the process of proving the ability of a pipeline and piping systems to contain product without leaking. This product may be liquid, gaseous or multiphase hydrocarbons, water, steam, CO_{2}, N_{2}, petrol, aviation fuel etc.

Pre-commissioning is the series of processes carried out on the pipeline before the final product is introduced. The process during which the pipeline is made "live" i.e. the product is put in the pipeline, is called pipeline commissioning or start-up.

Despite being seen as an offshoot, or minor part of the business for the larger oil service companies, the pipeline pre-commissioning industry possesses quite a large portfolio of services including, but not limited to the following services:

Pipeline Cleaning – this is carried out by pushing pigs or gel pigs through the pipeline to remove any debris buildup or corrosion.

Pipeline Gauging – this is carried out to prove the dimensional quality of the internal diameter of the pipeline.

Pipeline Filling (Flooding) – which can be carried out by propelling pigs through the pipeline with water or free flooding with water (normally for smaller or unpiggable pipelines).

Hydrotesting – this is a process by which the pipeline in question is pressure tested to a predefined pressure above the operating design pressure of the pipeline.

Dewatering – this involves pushing pigs through the pipeline propelled by a gas to remove the water prior to start-up.

Other services include vacuum drying, degassing, pneumatic testing, barrier testing, leak testing, decommissioning to mention but a few.

On the pipeline process pre-commissioning side, there are various services such as chemical cleaning, helium leak detection, bolting, hot oil flushing, pipe freezing, foam inerting etc...

Other services include valve testing, umbilical testing, hot tapping, leak metering, riser annulus testing.
