= Leak noise correlator =

A leak noise correlator is an electronic device used for Leak Detection and as a leak locator to find leaks in pressurized water or gas lines.

Typically, microphones or acoustic sound sensors are placed in contact with the pipe, at two or more points, to record the sound emitted by a leak (e.g. a hissing noise) somewhere between the points. The sound data is processed through a mathematical algorithm which compares or correlates the two recordings to determine the difference in the times it takes noise to travel from the site of the leak to each of the sensors. If the distance between the sensors is known in advance, this timing information can be used to determine the location of the leak.,

The cross correlation signal of one continuous function, f, with another, g, is defined as:

$$(f \star g)(t)\ \stackrel{\mathrm{def}}{=} \int_{-\infty}^{\infty} f^*(\tau)\ g(t+\tau)\,d\tau,$$

where f * denotes the complex conjugate of f.

If f and g are two sound recordings of the noise produced by the leak, delayed in time by a different unknown amount, the time delay can be found by determining the time offset for which the cross correlation product has a maximum value. This approach should be accurate so long as the sound of the leak received at each sensor is sufficiently similar over a period of time.

Leak correlators require accurate information about the materials through which the leak sound is traveling in order to perform an accurate time calculation. The user normally has to input the size and type of pipe as well as the distances of the loggers from each other. Many standard pipe sizes have known speeds of sound which can be used for the calculation. If the materials are unknown, the speed of sound through the materials will have to be calculated on site to get an accurate leak correlation.

Most correlators can also analyze the sound levels and sound frequencies to determine other information about the leak such as the size and severity of the leak or whether it's on the pipe, a valve or hydrant, or in a service line.

Most leak correlators serve two major purposes. First to detect the presence of a leak, second to pinpoint the location of the leak for repair when detected.

== See also ==
- Domestic water system
- Water
  - Water pipes
  - Water supply
- Leak
- Pipe (material)
- Water pipe
- Leak Detection

== Notes and references ==
The Misconceptions of Leak Detection
