= Pipe Cutting =

Pipe cutting or pipe profiling is a mechanized industrial process that removes material from pipe or tubing to create a desired profile. Typical profiles include straight cuts, mitres, saddles and midsection holes. These complex cuts are usually required to allow a tight fit between two parts that are to be joined via arc welding.

Pipe cutting is used in industries such as offshore operations, pipe processing, shipbuilding and pressure vessel manufacture. This technology is valued for its ability to produce the intricate cuts and profiles often required in these fields. Common applications include pipework, offshore jackets, steel frameworks, cranes, and demolition of structures offshore.

== Hot cutting ==
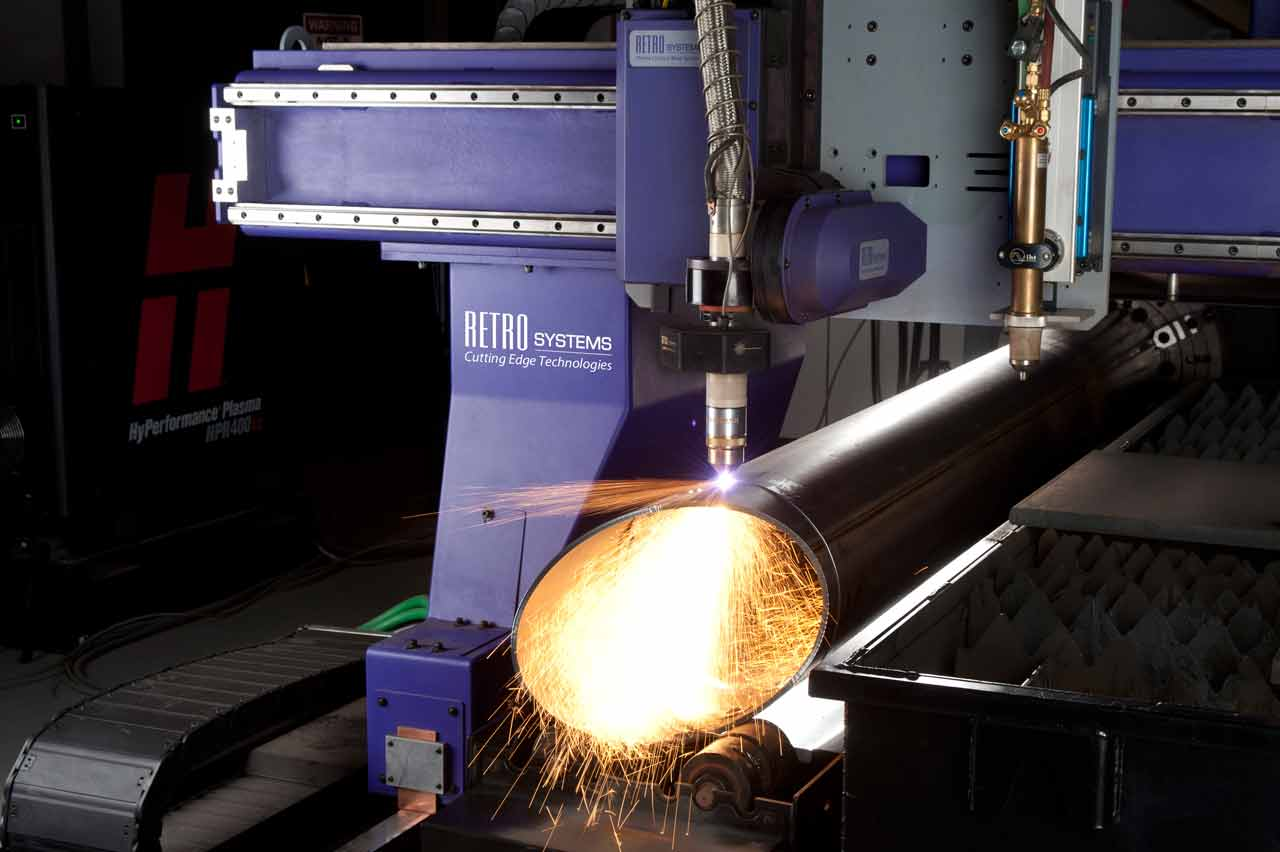
Plasma CNC Pipe Cutting

Hot cutting refers to a process in which materials are cut using a thermal torch. One of the most common techniques is oxy-fuel gas cutting, which is used extensively for cutting carbon and low-alloy steels. However, its efficiency diminishes as the alloy content of the material increases, limiting its applicability for high-alloy steels. Arc-based cutting methods are used for cutting these materials. Among these, plasma arc cutting is the most commonly employed technique, owing to its precision and ability to cut through high-alloy steels efficiently. Thermal cutting creates a shallow region contaminated material adjacent to the cut surfaces - the heat affected zone. For some applications it is necessary to remove this material by mechanical means, such as grinding or machining, prior to use or further fabrication by welding.

The cutting torch can be integrated into a machine to perform precision cutting operations. In multi-axis machines, the movement of the axes is powered by electric motors and synchronized to guide the torch and the pipe being cut along a programmed path, resulting in the desired cutting profile. The synchronization of axes is accomplished either mechanically, via cams, levers and gears, or electronically with microprocessors, which is computer numerical control (CNC).

== Cold cutting ==
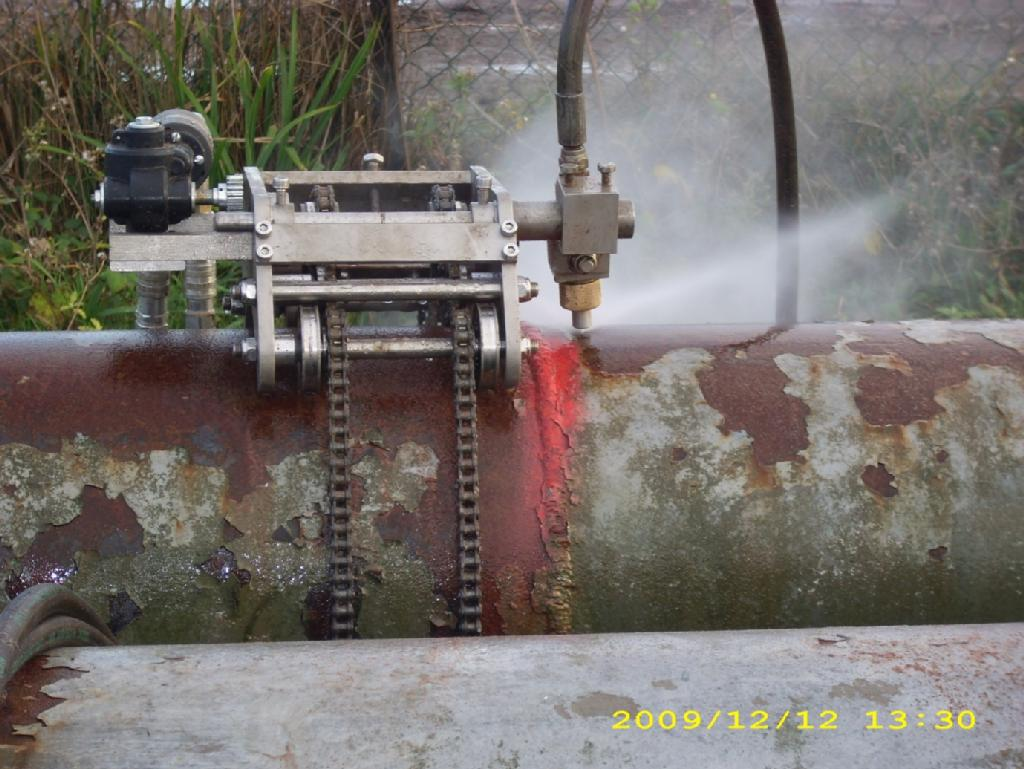
Pipe Abrasive Water Jet Cutting Manipulator

Where the high temperatures and sources of ignition required by hot cutting are not desirable, air- or hydraulically-powered pipe cutting machines are used. These comprise a clamshell or chain-mounted cutting head holding a tool steel and feed mechanism which advances the tool a set amount per revolution round the pipe. Tools may be styled to cut and/or prepare the bevel for welding in a single or multiple passes.

High pressure abrasive water jets can be used for cold cutting. This technology is employed for the decommissioning of offshore structures.
