= Hydrostatic test =

Non-destructive test of pressure vessels

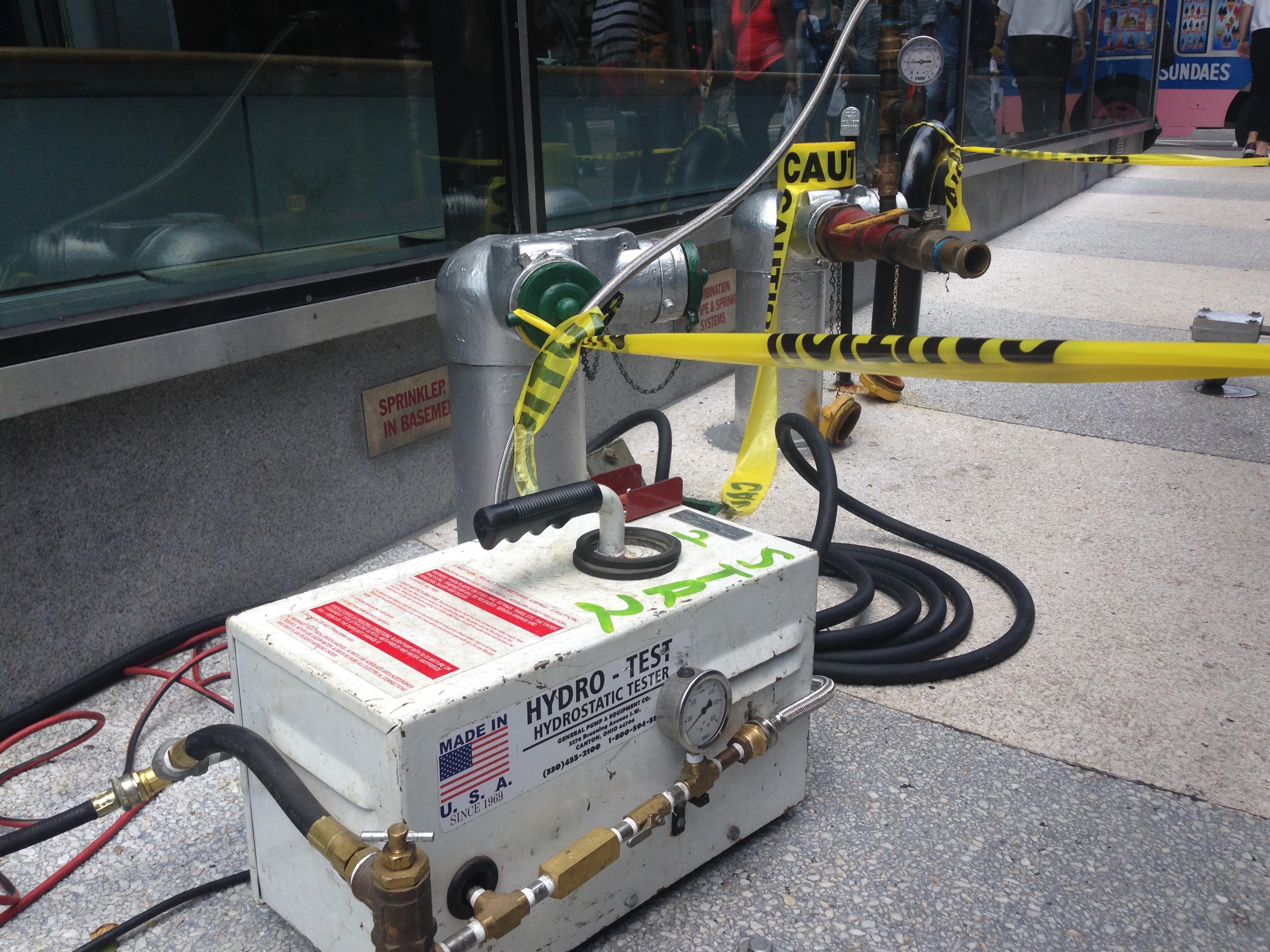
Hydrostatic tester

A hydrostatic test is a way in which pressure vessels such as pipelines, plumbing, gas cylinders, boilers and fuel tanks can be tested for strength and leaks. The test involves filling the vessel or pipe system with a liquid, usually water, which may be dyed to aid in visual leak detection, and pressurization of the vessel to the specified test pressure. Pressure tightness can be tested by shutting off the supply valve and observing whether there is a pressure loss. The location of a leak can be visually identified more easily if the water contains a colorant. Strength is usually tested by measuring permanent deformation of the container.

Hydrostatic testing is the most common method employed for testing pipes and pressure vessels. Using this test helps maintain safety standards and durability of a vessel over time. Newly manufactured pieces are initially qualified using the hydrostatic test. They are then revalidated at regular intervals according to the relevant standard. In some cases where a hydrostatic test is not practicable a pneumatic pressure test may be an acceptable alternative.

Testing of pressure vessels for transport and storage of gases is very important because such containers can explode if they fail under pressure.

== Testing procedures ==
Hydrostatic tests are conducted under the constraints of either the industry's or the customer's specifications, or may be required by law. The vessel is filled with a nearly incompressible liquid – usually water or oil – pressurised to test pressure, and examined for leaks or permanent changes in shape. Red or fluorescent dyes may be added to the water to make leaks easier to see. The test pressure is always considerably higher than the operating pressure to give a factor of safety. This factor of safety is typically 166.66%, 143% or 150% of the designed working pressure, depending on the regulations that apply. For example, if a cylinder was rated to DOT-2015 PSI (approximately 139 bar), it would be tested at around 3360 PSI (approximately 232 bar).

Water is commonly used because it is cheap and easily available, and is usually harmless to the system to be tested. Hydraulic fluids and oils may be specified where contamination with water could cause problems. These fluids are nearly incompressible, therefore requiring relatively little work to develop a high pressure, and is therefore also only able to release a small amount of energy in case of a failure - only a small volume will escape under high pressure if the container fails. If high pressure gas were used, then the gas would expand to V=(nRT)/p with its compressed volume resulting in an explosion, with the attendant risk of damage or injury.

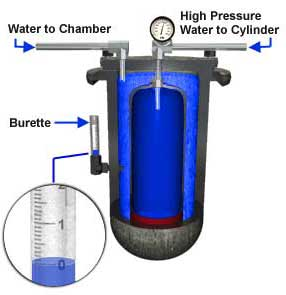
Water jacket test

Small pressure vessels are normally tested using a water jacket test. The vessel is visually examined for defects and then placed in a container filled with water, and in which the change in volume of the vessel can be measured, usually by monitoring the water level in a calibrated tube. The vessel is then pressurised for a specified period, usually 30 or more seconds, and if specified, the expansion will be measured by reading off the amount of liquid that has been forced into the measuring tube by the volume increase of the pressurised vessel. The vessel is then depressurised, and the permanent volume increase due to plastic deformation while under pressure (permanent set) is measured by comparing the final volume in the measuring tube with the volume before pressurisation.

A leak will give a similar result to permanent set, but will be detectable by holding the volume in the pressurised vessel by closing the inlet valve for a period before depressurising, as the pressure will drop steadily during this period if there is a leak. In most cases a permanent set that exceeds the specified maximum will indicate failure. A leak may also be a failure criterion, but it may be that the leak is due to poor sealing of the test equipment. If the vessel fails, it will normally go through a condemning process marking the cylinder as unsafe.

The information needed to specify the test is stamped onto the cylinder. This includes the design standard, serial number, manufacturer, and manufacture date. After testing, the vessel or its nameplate will usually be stamp marked with the date of the successful test, and the test facility's identification mark.

A simpler test, that is also considered a hydrostatic test but does not require pressure pumps, is to pressurise the vessel by filling it with water to a hydrostatic head by using a riser pipe connected to the tank and to physically examine the outside for leaks. This type of test is suitable for containers such as boat fuel tanks, which are not pressure vessels but must work under the hydrostatic pressure of the contents. A hydrostatic test head is usually specified as a height above the tank top. The tank is pressurised by filling water to the specified height through a temporary standpipe if necessary. It may be necessary to seal vents and other outlets during the test.

== Examples ==
Portable fire extinguishers are safety tools that are required in most public buildings. Fire extinguishers are also recommended in homes. Over time the conditions in which they are housed, and the manner in which they are handled affect the structural integrity of the extinguisher. A structurally weakened fire extinguisher can malfunction or even burst when it is needed the most. To maintain the quality and safety of this product, hydrostatic testing is utilized. All critical components of the fire extinguisher should be tested to ensure proper function.

== Pipeline testing ==
Hydrotesting of pipes, pipelines and vessels is performed to expose defective materials that have missed prior detection, ensure that any remaining defects are insignificant enough to allow operation at design pressures, expose possible leaks and serve as a final validation of the integrity of the constructed system. ASME B31.3 requires this testing to ensure tightness and strength.

Buried high pressure oil and gas pipelines are tested for strength by pressurising them to at least 125% of their maximum allowable working pressure (MAWP) at any point along their length. Since many long distance transmission pipelines are designed to have a steel hoop stress of 80% of specified minimum yield strength (SMYS) at Maximum allowable operating pressure MAOP, this means that the steel is stressed to SMYS and above during the testing, and test sections must be selected to ensure that excessive plastic deformation does not occur.

For piping built to ASME B31.3, if the design temperature is greater than the test temperature, then the test pressure must be adjusted for the related allowable stress at the design temperature. This is done by multiplying 1.5 MAWP by the ratio of the allowable stress at the test temperature to allowable stress at the design temperature per ASME B31.3 Section 345.4.2 Equation 24. Test pressures need not exceed a value that would produce a stress higher than yield stress at test temperature. ASME B31.3 section 345.4.2 (c)

Other codes require a more onerous approach. BS PD 8010-2 requires testing to 150% of the design pressure – which should not be less than the MAOP plus surge and other incidental effects that will occur during normal operation.

Leak testing is performed by balancing changes in the measured pressure in the test section against the theoretical pressure changes calculated from changes in the measured temperature of the test section.

Australian standard AS2885.5 "Pipelines – Gas and liquid petroleum: Part 5: Field pressure testing" gives an excellent explanation of the factors involved.

In the aerospace industry, depending on the airline, company or customer, certain codes will need to be followed. For example, Bell Helicopter has a certain specification that will have to be followed for any parts that will be used in their helicopters.

== Testing frequency ==
Most countries have legislation or pressure vessel codes which requires vessels to be regularly tested, for example every two years (with a visual inspection annually) for high pressure gas cylinders and every five or ten years for lower pressure ones such as used in fire extinguishers. Gas cylinders which fail are normally destroyed as part of the testing protocol to avoid the dangers inherent in them being subsequently used.

These common US standard gas cylinders have the following requirements:

- DOT-3AL gas cylinders must be tested every 5 years and have an unlimited life.
- DOT-3HT gas cylinders must be tested every 3 years and have a 24-year life.
- DOT-3AA gas cylinders must be tested every 5 years and have an unlimited life. (Unless stamped with a star (*) in which case the cylinder meets certain specifications and can have a 10-year hydrostatic test life).

Typically organizations such as DOT PHMSA, ISO, ASTM and ASME specify the guidelines for the different types of pressure vessels.

== Safety ==
Hydraulic testing is a hazardous process and should be performed with caution by competent personnel. Adhering to prescribed procedures defined in relevant technical standards appropriate to the specific application and jurisdiction will usually reduce these risks to an acceptable level.

- A leak of high pressure liquid can cut or penetrate the skin and inject itself into body tissues. This can cause serious direct injury to the operator, and if the fluid is toxic or contaminated there will be additional adverse effects.
- A pressurised hose that is not securely attached or which fails under pressure may whip around spraying water or oil and could hit someone and cause injuries. A whiplash arrestor can be used to restrain such hoses.
- Enclosing the components to be tested, hazard signage, use of appropriate personal protective equipment and providing barriers to access for non-essential personnel are common precautions.

== See also ==
- Nondestructive testing – Type of analysis technique
- Testing and inspection of diving cylinders – Periodical inspection and testing to revalidate fitness for service
