= National Register of Historic Places listings in McPherson County, Kansas =

Location of McPherson County in Kansas

This is a list of the National Register of Historic Places listings in McPherson County, Kansas.

This is intended to be a complete list of the properties and districts on the National Register of Historic Places in McPherson County, Kansas, United States. The locations of National Register properties and districts for which the latitude and longitude coordinates are included below, may be seen in a map.

There are 27 properties and districts listed on the National Register in the county.

This National Park Service list is complete through NPS recent listings posted January 2, 2026.

== Current listings ==
	Name on the Register	Image	Date listed	Location	City or town	Description
1	Berquist & Nelson Drugstore Building	Berquist & Nelson Drugstore Building	April 22, 2009 (#09000228)	105 N. Main St. 38°34′25″N 97°40′33″W	Lindsborg	
2	Bethany Lutheran Church and Parsonage	Bethany Lutheran Church and Parsonage	May 11, 2023 (#100008966)	320-340 North Main St. 38°34′38″N 97°40′33″W	Lindsborg	
3	Canton Township Carnegie Library	Canton Township Carnegie Library	June 25, 1987 (#87000960)	300 N. Main; 38°23′17″N 97°25′35″W	Canton	
4	Farmers State Bank	Farmers State Bank	October 16, 2008 (#08000985)	101 S. Main St. 38°34′24″N 97°40′33″W	Lindsborg	
5	Hans Hanson House	Hans Hanson House	February 19, 1982 (#82002665)	211 E. 5th St. 38°33′24″N 97°49′54″W	Marquette	
6	Hjerpe Grocery	Hjerpe Grocery	July 11, 2010 (#10000447)	110 & 112 N. Main St. 38°34′26″N 97°40′31″W	Lindsborg	
7	Holmberg and Johnson Blacksmith Shop	Holmberg and Johnson Blacksmith Shop	April 22, 2009 (#09000230)	122 N. Main St. 38°34′26″N 97°40′33″W	Lindsborg	
8	Inman I.O.O.F. Hall	Inman I.O.O.F. Hall	April 15, 2011 (#11000195)	100 N. Main. 38°13′55″N 97°46′32″W	Inman	
9	Johnson House	Johnson House	March 19, 1998 (#98000251)	226 W. Lincoln; 38°34′51″N 97°40′43″W	Lindsborg	
10	Lakeside Park Band Shell	Lakeside Park Band Shell	August 20, 2025 (#100012140)	511 N. Lakeside Drive; 38°22′21″N 97°39′09″W	McPherson	
11	Kuns-Collier House	Kuns-Collier House	March 8, 2006 (#06000114)	302 S. Walnut St. 38°22′01″N 97°40′10″W	McPherson	
12	P.J. Lindquist Building	P.J. Lindquist Building	June 8, 2015 (#15000318)	116 S. Main St. 38°34′22″N 97°40′33″W	Lindsborg	
13	McPherson Community Building	McPherson Community Building	June 29, 2018 (#100002628)	122 E. Marlin St. 38°22′13″N 97°39′57″W	McPherson	
14	McPherson County Courthouse	McPherson County Courthouse	November 21, 1976 (#76002264)	Maple and Kansas Aves. 38°22′12″N 97°40′07″W	McPherson	
15	McPherson Opera House	McPherson Opera House	March 16, 1972 (#72001452)	221 S. Main St. 38°22′02″N 97°39′59″W	McPherson	
16	North Gypsum Creek Truss Leg Bedstead Bridge	North Gypsum Creek Truss Leg Bedstead Bridge	May 9, 2003 (#03000367)	Sioux Rd., 0.2 miles east of intersection with 24th Ave., 1.0 mile south and 2.8 miles west of Roxbury; 38°32′12″N 97°28′39″W	Roxbury	
17	Paint Creek Archeological Site		June 20, 1972 (#72001449)	Western bank of Paint Creek, 1.5 miles (2.4 km) south of its confluence with the Smoky Hill River; 38°30′05″N 97°42′55″W	Lindsborg	Formerly known as the Salina 1 Site
18	Anton Pearson House and Studio	Anton Pearson House and Studio	April 2, 2021 (#100006324)	505 South Main St. 38°34′03″N 97°40′33″W	Lindsborg	
19	Power Plant No. 1	Power Plant No. 1	October 10, 2007 (#07001067)	414 W. Elizabeth St. 38°22′06″N 97°40′16″W	McPherson	
20	Rosberg-Holmgren-Clareen Block	Rosberg-Holmgren-Clareen Block	April 22, 2009 (#09000229)	109-111-113 N. Main St. 38°34′25″N 97°40′33″W	Lindsborg	Formerly listed as the Clareen-Peterson Restaurant Building; expanded and renamed October 11, 2016
21	Heinrich H. Schroeder Barn		September 21, 2005 (#05001051)	632 29th Ave. 38°16′03″N 97°23′18″W	Canton	
22	Sharps Creek Archeological Site		June 22, 1972 (#72001450)	Eastern side of Sharps Creek, 1.5 miles (2.4 km) above its confluence with the Smoky Hill River; 38°30′25″N 97°45′42″W	Lindsborg	
23	Smoky Valley Roller Mill	Smoky Valley Roller Mill	February 23, 1972 (#72001451)	Mill St. 38°34′39″N 97°40′39″W	Lindsborg	
24	Swedish Pavilion	Swedish Pavilion	March 20, 1973 (#73002129)	Mill St. 38°34′02″N 97°40′27″W	Lindsborg	
25	Teichgraeber-Runbeck House	Teichgraeber-Runbeck House	November 15, 2005 (#05001239)	116 Mill St. 38°33′57″N 97°40′29″W	Lindsborg	
26	US Post Office-Lindsborg	US Post Office-Lindsborg	October 17, 1989 (#89001646)	125 E. Lincoln St. 38°34′27″N 97°39′50″W	Lindsborg	
27	John R. Wright House	John R. Wright House	May 2, 2002 (#02000427)	322 W. Marlin St. 38°22′14″N 97°40′13″W	McPherson	

== See also ==
- List of National Historic Landmarks in Kansas
- National Register of Historic Places listings in Kansas
