= Sharps Creek =

Sharps Creek may refer to:

- Sharps Creek (Kansas), a stream in McPherson and Rice counties
- Sharps Creek (Oregon), a stream in Lane County

== See also ==
- Sharpe Creek, a creek in Georgia sometimes known as "Sharps Creek"
