= Collier House =

Collier House may refer to the following in the United States (by state)

- Collier-Overby House, Tuscaloosa, listed on the NRHP in Alabama
- Collier House (Pine Bluff, Arkansas), formerly NRHP-listed in Arkansas
- Kuns-Collier House, McPherson, listed on the NRHP in Kansas
- Brandon-Bell-Collier House, Fulton, listed on the NRHP in Missouri
- Collier-Crichlow House, Murfreesboro, listed on the NRHP in Tennessee
- Collier House (University of Oregon), (1886) existing building and former faculty club and restaurant
