= Lester Raymer =

American artist

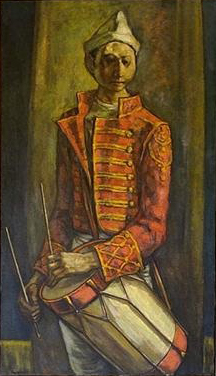
Untitled, drummer boy, oil on board, 1962, Raymer Society collection, gift from Barbara and Roger Ellis. Photo by Jaderborg Photography.

Lester Wilton Raymer (September 24, 1907 – 1991) was an American artist from Alva, Oklahoma.

Raymer studied at the Art Institute of Chicago from 1930 to 1933, received a Bachelor of Fine Arts degree. While there, he studied with Russian painter Boris Anisfeld and art historian Helen Gardner.

Most well known for his paintings, Raymer worked in many mediums including prints, fiber art, metal work, mosaics, ceramics, wood carving, jewelry, cast concrete, sculptures, tin ornaments, furniture, toys, and more.

Many of his works are now on display at the Red Barn Studio in Lindsborg, Kansas.
