= Svensk Hyllningsfest =

Biennial Swedish festival in Lindsborg, Kansas

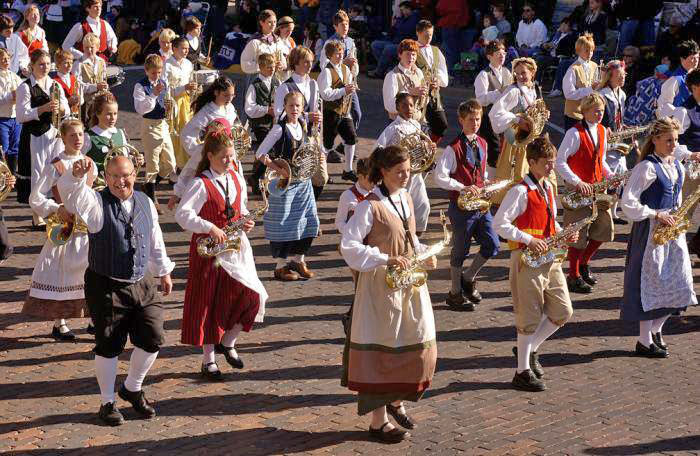
- Parade during Svensk Hyllningsfest.
- Date: October 17–18, 2025 (most recent)
- Location: Lindsborg, Kansas United States; 38.578°N 97.674°W
- Type: Festival
- Theme: Swedish heritage
- Website: svenskhyllningsfest.org

Svensk Hyllningsfest (Swedish: [ˈsvɛnːsk ˈhʏ̂lːnɪŋsˌfɛst], "Swedish Honoring Festival") is a biennial celebration held in Lindsborg, Kansas, in October of odd-numbered years, to celebrate the Swedish heritage of the community. The festival includes Swedish dancing, foods (including lutfisk), cooking demonstrations, arts and crafts, entertainment by local artists and musicians, a parade, and a smörgåsbord. Events included at the festival are dancing, cooking demonstrations, arts, crafts, musical entertainment, and folk dancing, provided by town residents. A group of 400 students begin learning dances for this event in the first grade and practices for the festival begin early in the school year. High school students participate as part of the Lindsborg Swedish Folk Dancers, a group of select high school students that agree to participate for four years as ambassadors for the Lindsborg community. Svensk Hyllningsfest is just one of their many performances.

== History ==
Svensk Hyllningsfest first started in 1941, but wasn't held in 1943. The most recent Svensk Hyllningsfest was held on October 17 and 18, 2025.

== See also ==
- Swedish festivities
- List of festivals in the United States
