= Coronado Heights =

Hill northwest of Lindsborg, Kansas, United States

Coordinates: 38°36′42″N 97°42′14″W

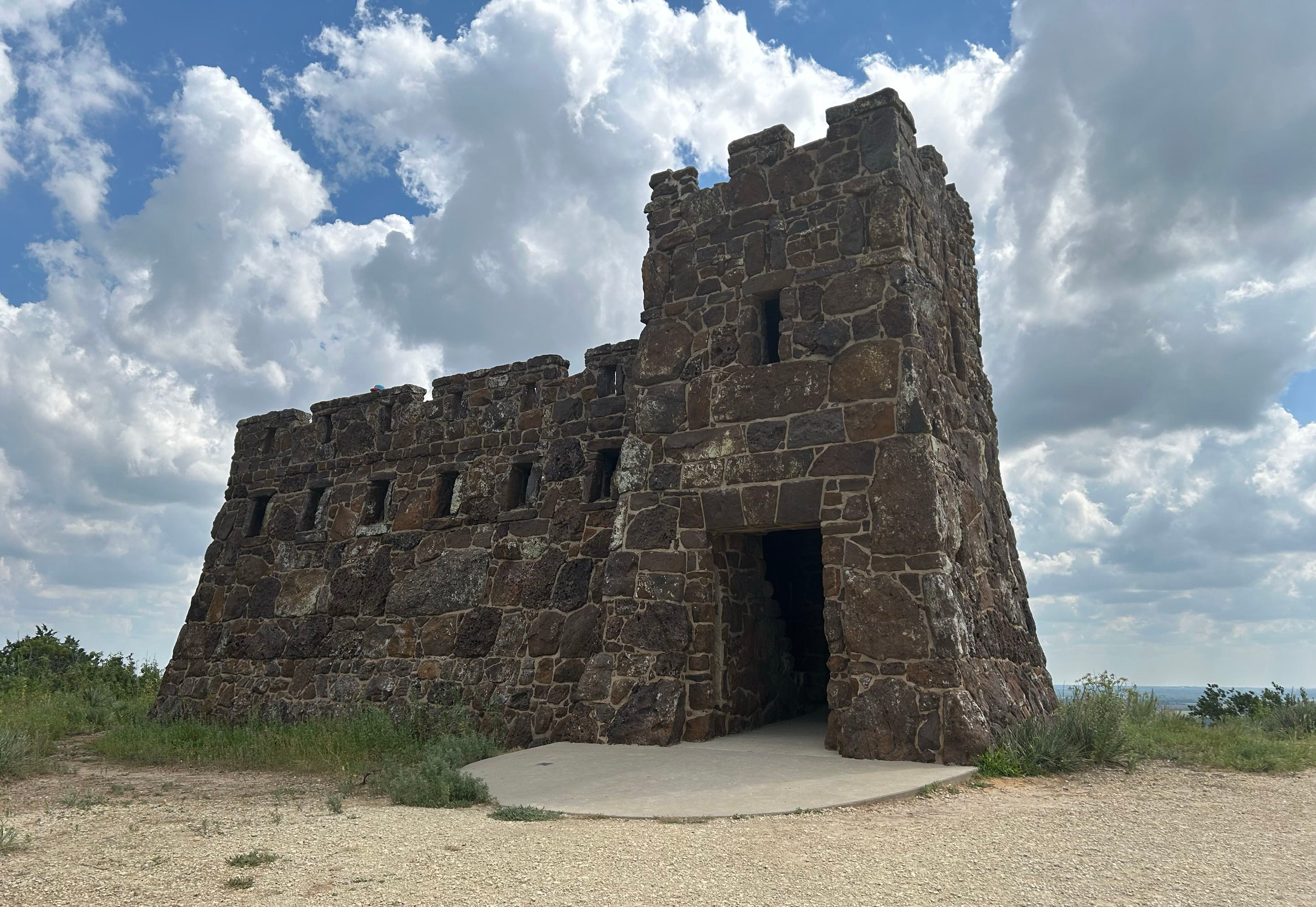
Castle-like shelter on the hilltop

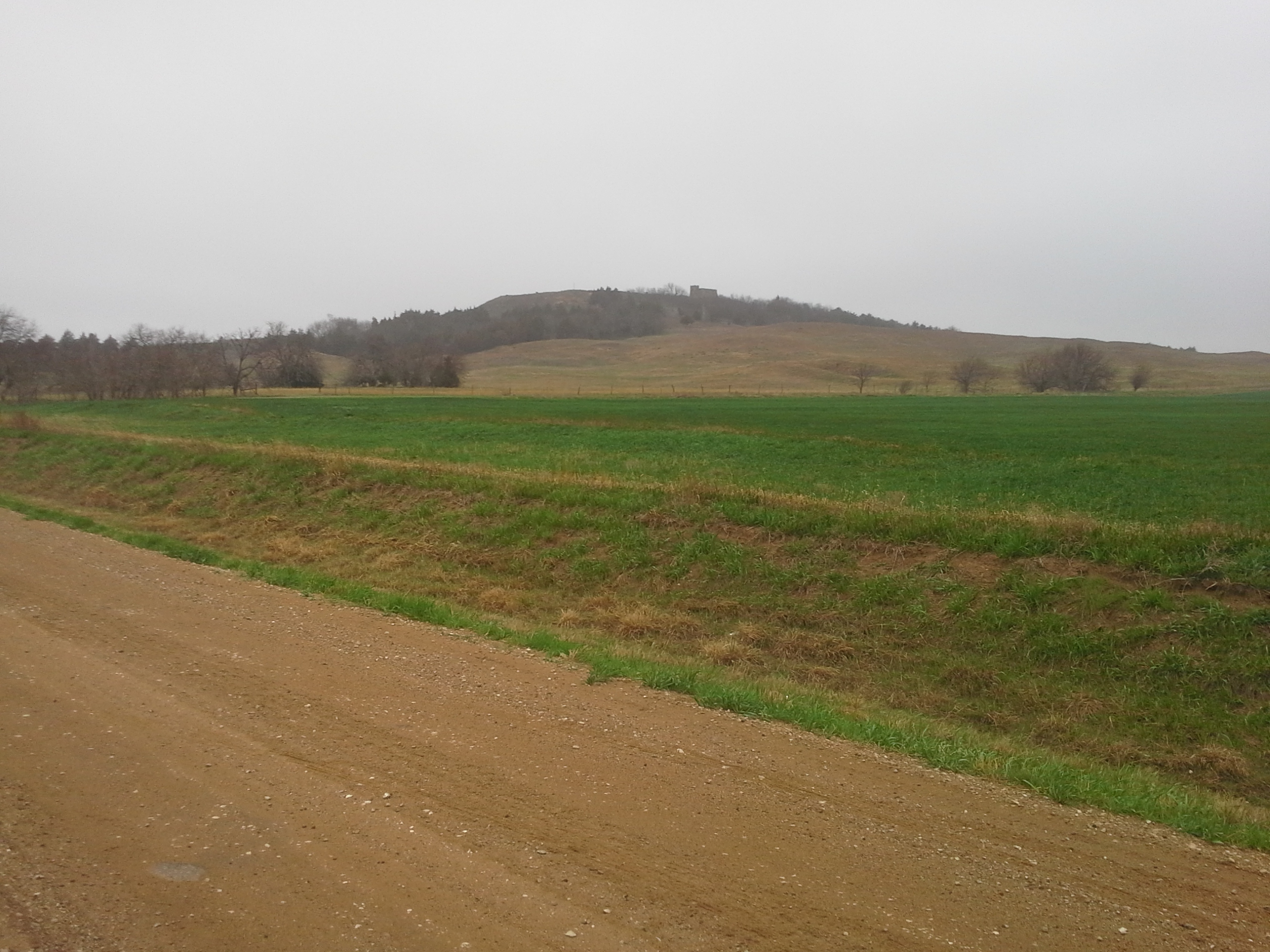
Coronado Heights

Coronado Heights is a hill northwest of Lindsborg, Kansas, United States. It is alleged to be near the place where Francisco Vásquez de Coronado gave up his search for the seven cities of gold and turned around to return to Mexico. Coronado Heights is one of a chain of seven sandstone bluffs in the Dakota Formation and rises approximately 300 feet.

== History ==
In 1915, a professor at Bethany College in Lindsborg found chain mail from Spanish armor at the Sharps Creek Site, a Native American village excavation site a few miles southwest of the hill, and another Bethany College professor promoted the name of Coronado Heights for the hill.

In 1920, the first road was built up the hill, known as Swensson Drive, with a footpath known as Olsson Trail.

In 1936, a stone shelter resembling a castle was built on top of the hill as a project of the Works Progress Administration.

In 1988, a sculpture by John Whitfield was placed halfway up the hill with the inscription "Coronado Heights 'A Place to Share'".

The hill is now Coronado Heights Park, owned by the Smoky Valley Historical Association.
