= Hjerpe Grocery =

- U.S. National Register of Historic Places
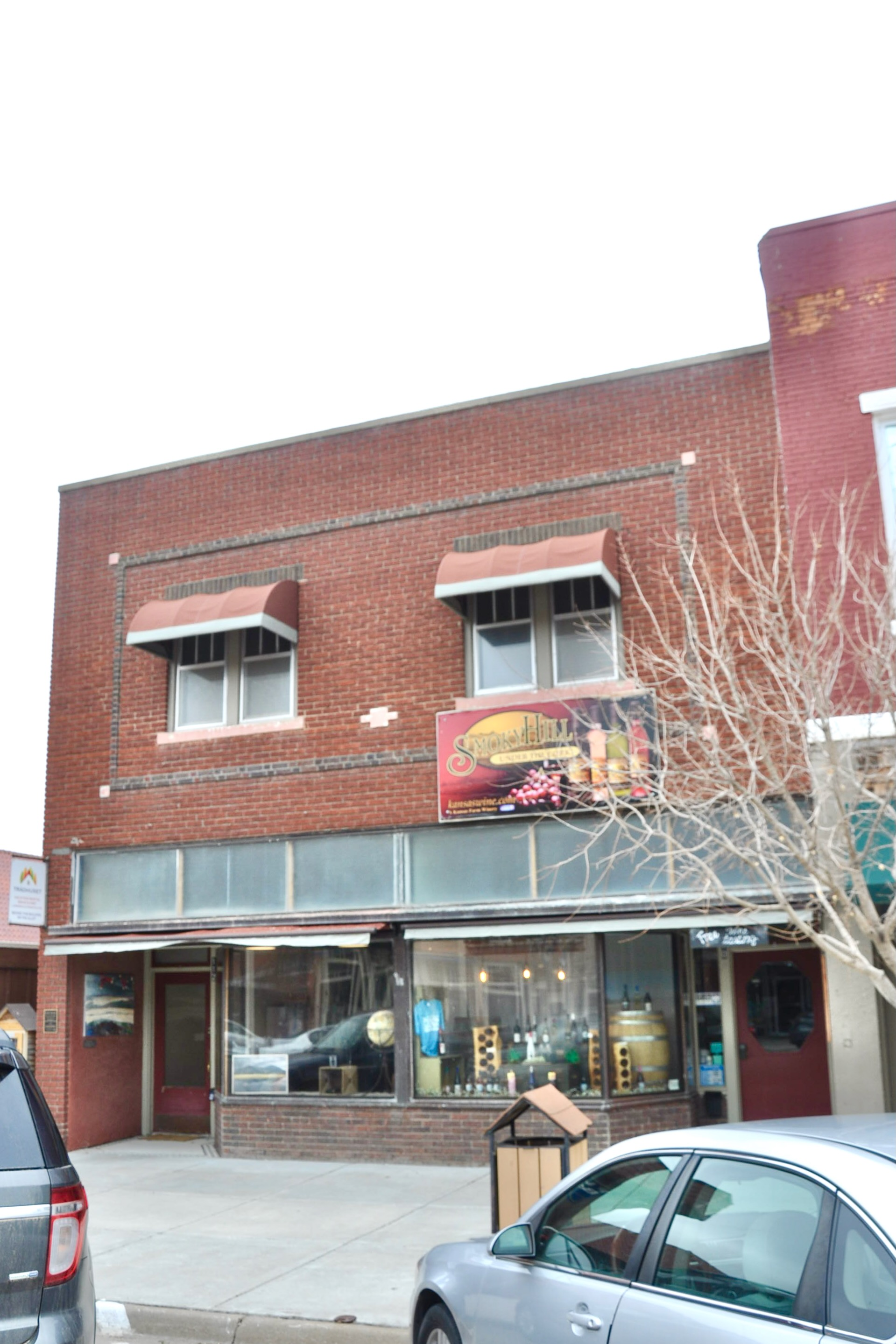

- Location within Kansas Location within the United States
- Location: 110 & 112 N Main, Lindsborg, Kansas
- Coordinates: 38°34′26″N 97°40′31″W
- Area: less than one acre
- Built: 1930
- Architectural style: Late 19th and Early 20th Century American Movements, Early Commercial
- NRHP reference No.: 10000447
- Added to NRHP: May 27, 2010

Hjerpe Grocery is a historic grocery store building at 110 & 112 N Main in Lindsborg, Kansas. The building in an early commercial building which features Late 19th and Early 20th Century American styles. It was built around 1930 and was added to the National Register of Historic Places in 2010.

It was deemed notable "as an intact example of Commercial Style Architecture" and "for its association with the early commerce of Lindsborg, Kansas, a Swedish-American community founded in 1869."

It is a two-story red brick building which is 26 by 50 feet (7.9 m × 15.2 m) in plan.
