= Paint Creek site =

- Paint Creek Site (14MP1)
- U.S. National Register of Historic Places
- Location within Kansas Location within the United States
- Location: Western bank of Paint Creek, 1.5 miles (2.4 km) south of its confluence with the Smoky Hill River
- Nearest city: Lindsborg, Kansas
- Coordinates: 38°30′5″N 97°42′55″W
- Area: 50 acres (20 ha)
- NRHP reference No.: 72001449
- Added to NRHP: June 20, 1972

Paint Creek Site (14MP1) is an historical site near Lindsborg in McPherson County, Kansas. This ancestral Wichita village is considered part of the Little River focus of the Great Bend aspect and was occupied around 1300 to 1650 CE.

The site was added to the National Register of Historic Places in 1972.
