= Sharps Creek Site =

- Sharps Creek Site (14MP408)
- U.S. National Register of Historic Places
- Nearest city: Lindsborg, Kansas
- NRHP reference No.: 72001450
- Added to NRHP: June 22, 1972

Sharps Creek Site or Swenson Site (14MP301) is an historic site in Lindsborg, Kansas.

A magnetic gradiometer survey of the site has been conducted. The site was occupied from circa 1500 to 1800. In 1915 a professor at nearby Bethany College found Spanish chain mail at the site, which led to the naming of nearby Coronado Heights, a large hill a few miles northeast of the site The site was added to the National Register of Historic Places in 1972.

== See also ==
- Sharps Creek
