= State visit by Carl XVI Gustaf to the United States =

First state visit by a reigning Swedish monarch to the United States

The 1976 visit of King Carl XVI Gustaf of Sweden to the United States was the first state visit by a monarch of Sweden to the United States. The visit, planned as part of the United States Bicentennial celebrations and one of several from foreign heads of states, marked a warming in Swedish–American relations after the Vietnam War. The 27-day tour lasted from April 2 to April 30, and included a formal reception by President Gerald Ford at the White House, as well as visits to Swedish American communities and other sites in 12 states.

== Background and planning ==
King Carl XVI Gustaf ascended the throne in 1973, succeeding his grandfather Gustaf VI Adolf at the age of 27. During Gustaf Adolf's reign, anti-war protests in Sweden had led to the recalling of the U.S. Ambassador in 1968 and the freezing of relations in 1972. Gustaf VI Adolf himself was critical of the U.S. involvement in the Vietnam War, calling for an end to the "merciless bombing" of Hanoi as part of Operation Linebacker II. Gustaf VI Adolf had visited the United States in 1926 and 1938 as Crown Prince, but no reigning Swedish monarch had traveled to the United States.

The upcoming U.S. Bicentennial celebration in 1976, commemorating the 200th anniversary of the nation's declaration of independence, was seen as an opportunity to invite the young king for a symbolic visit and repair relations between the two countries. Prime Minister Olof Palme, who was central to Sweden's hostilities with the United States during the Vietnam War, visited Moscow instead to promote Sweden's neutral stance during the ongoing Cold War. Minnesota Governor Wendell R. Anderson, an American of Swedish descent, traveled to Stockholm in July to meet the king and present a formal invitation on behalf of several Swedish American associations. A group of 20 Secret Service agents were dispatched by the U.S. government for the royal visit.

== East Coast: April 2–8 ==
King Carl XVI Gustaf and the nine members of the royal party, including Ambassador to the United States Wilhelm Wachtmeister and Foreign Affairs Minister Sven Andersson, arrived at John F. Kennedy International Airport in New York City on April 2. The party was flown to Newport News, Virginia, and toured historic Williamsburg before meeting Virginia congressman Robert Daniel at his home in Prince George County on April 3.

The King arrived in Washington, D.C., on April 4, touring the John F. Kennedy Center for the Performing Arts and National Air and Space Museum. He was received by President Gerald Ford at the White House on April 5, engaging in a conversation in the Oval Office with Secretary of State Henry Kissinger that morning. He spent the evening at a dinner at the residence of Ambassador Wachtmeister, inviting Kissinger, Vice President Nelson Rockefeller, Chief Justice Warren Burger, and Senators of Swedish descent. The King departed Washington for Philadelphia on April 6, where he toured the American Swedish Historical Museum, whose cornerstone was laid in a 1938 by then-Crown Prince Gustaf VI Adolf. In Philadelphia, he also toured the Liberty Bell with Mayor Frank Rizzo and Tinicum Island in the Delaware River. On April 8, the King visited the community of Swedesboro, New Jersey, accompanied by New Jersey Governor Brendan Byrne, and was received by 2,000 of its residents. The visits to Tinicum and Swedesboro were part of a commemoration of the founding of New Sweden in the 17th century by Swedish immigrants.

== Minnesota and Seattle: April 8–11 ==
The King arrived in Minneapolis on April 8, visiting Gustavus Adolphus College in St. Peter, meeting with Governor Anderson, and speaking to a crowd of 8,500 at the Minneapolis Auditorium the following day.

The King flew to Seattle, Washington, on April 10, arriving to a crowd of 300 onlookers at Seattle–Tacoma International Airport. The following day, he dedicated the Ballard Avenue Historic District in the city's Scandinavian enclave, Ballard, with Mayor Wes Uhlman, and addressed the Swedish Club of Ballard. The King opened a photography exhibit of the Swedish Americans in the Puget Sound region at the University of Washington, where he visited the university's Scandinavian department. He embarked on a helicopter tour of Weyerhaeuser's timber and forestry operations in the region, including a tour of the company's headquarters in Federal Way. At an evening banquet, the King decorated five Seattleites of Swedish descent with the Order of the Polar Star, and was received by Governor of Washington Daniel J. Evans.

== California, Colorado, and Kansas: April 13–17 ==
The King arrived in San Francisco on April 13, touring the University of California at Berkeley campus and the Lawrence Berkeley National Laboratory. The royal entourage had planned to ride on Bay Area Rapid Transit and the city's cable car system, but potential picketing from workers on strike forced the plan to be shelved. He traveled to Los Angeles the following day and toured The Burbank Studios and a McDonnell Douglas factory to observe the construction of a Scandinavian Airlines DC-10 jet. The King was received by 200 Hollywood personalities at a lunch hosted by Edgar Bergen, a Swedish American comedian.

The King flew to Aspen, Colorado for two days of recreation at the Vail Ski Resort, a favorite of President Ford's, on April 15. He skied for several hours, accompanied by Secret Service agents, while wearing a ski outfit in the colors of the Swedish flag. The King made a visit to Lindsborg, Kansas on April 17, arriving two hours late due to inclement weather, and was greeted by a crowd of 5,000 people (which outnumbered the town's population of 2,600) and Kansas Governor Robert Frederick Bennett. The town, a Swedish American community with annual Swedish festivals, received the King at the preserved Swedish pavilion from the 1904 World's Fair, as part of a town-wide celebration. The royal motorcade had moved quickly through the town, due to the delayed arrival, causing onlookers to react in disappointment over the brevity of the visit.

== Illinois: April 18–22 ==
The King attended an Easter service at Chicago's Ebenezer Lutheran Church on April 18, located in the city's Swedish enclave, with Illinois Governor Dan Walker; at the time, he was recovering from a sore throat. Later in the day, he visited the offices of Chicago-based Swedish newspaper Svenska Amerikanaren Tribunen. On Monday, April 19, the King dedicated the new Swedish American Museum in Andersonville.
