= Farmers State Bank (Lindsborg, Kansas) =

- U.S. National Register of Historic Places
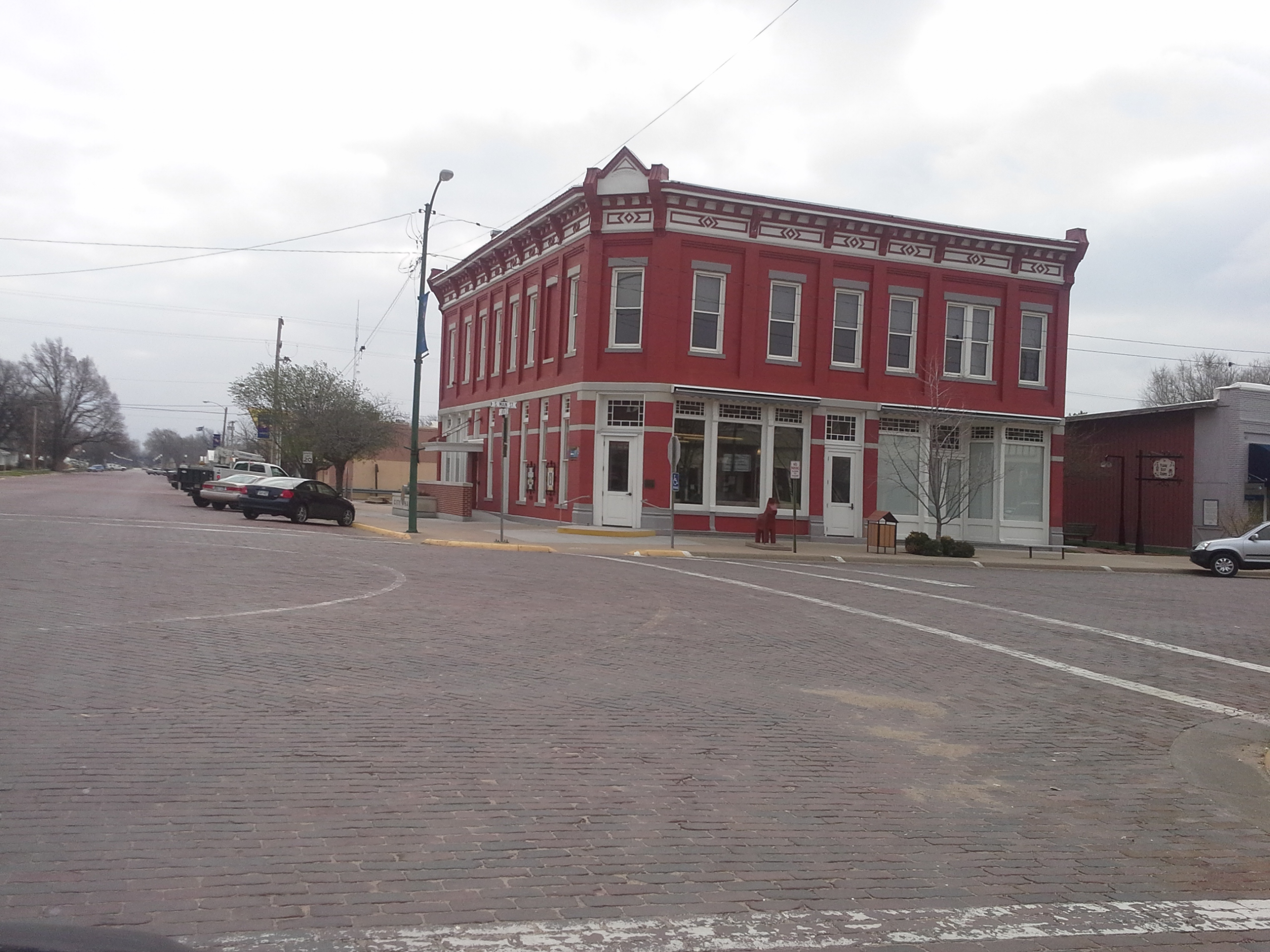

- Location within Kansas Location within the United States
- Location: 101 S. Main, Lindsborg, Kansas
- Coordinates: 38.57326°N 97.67564°W
- Area: less than one acre
- Built: 1887
- Architectural style: Italianate
- NRHP reference No.: 08000985
- Added to NRHP: October 16, 2008

Farmers State Bank is a historic bank building at 101 South Main Street in Lindsborg, Kansas, United States, that is now the Lindsborg City Hall. The Italianate building was constructed in 1887 as a branch of the Farmers State Bank and "was the only bank of three to survive the Great Depression. In modern times the bank became a branch of Bank of America and another financial institution assumed the Farmers State name. The building became Lindsborg's City Hall in 1955 when the bank moved to a new building one-half block north of this location." The building was added to the National Register of Historic Places in 2008.
