= Berquist & Nelson Drugstore Building =

- U.S. National Register of Historic Places
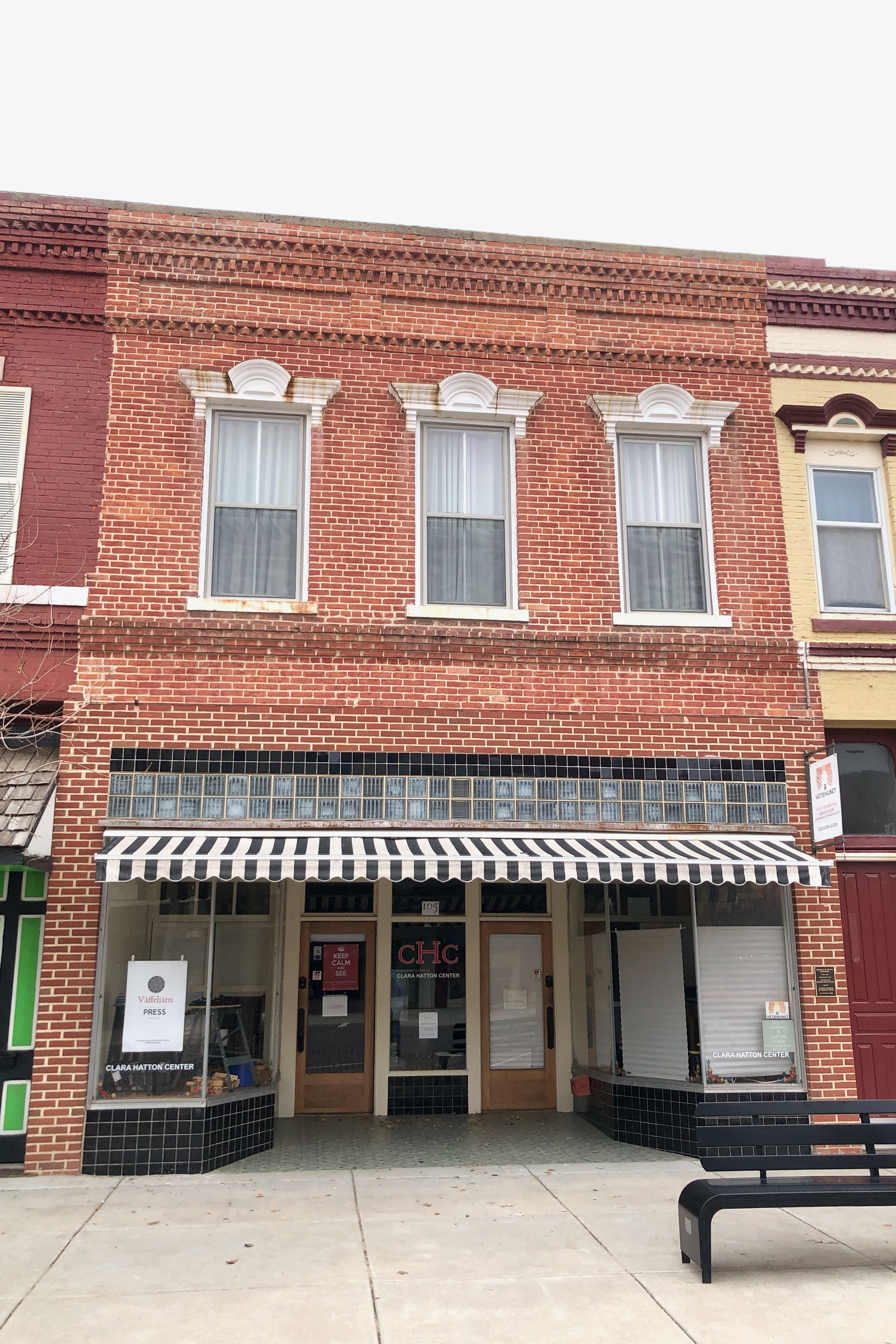

- Location within Kansas
- Location: 105 N. Main St., Lindsborg, Kansas
- Coordinates: 38°34′26″N 97°40′33″W
- Area: less than one acre
- Built: c.1880
- Architectural style: Early Commercial
- NRHP reference No.: 09000228
- Added to NRHP: April 22, 2009

Berquist & Nelson Drugstore Building is a historic drugstore at 105 N. Main Street in Lindsborg, Kansas. It was built in c.1880 and added to the National Register of Historic Places in 2009.

It is a two-story brick commercial building which "is distinguished by its corbelled parapet and shaped metal window hoods." It has a stone foundation and a flat roof.
