= Swedish Pavilion =

- U.S. National Register of Historic Places
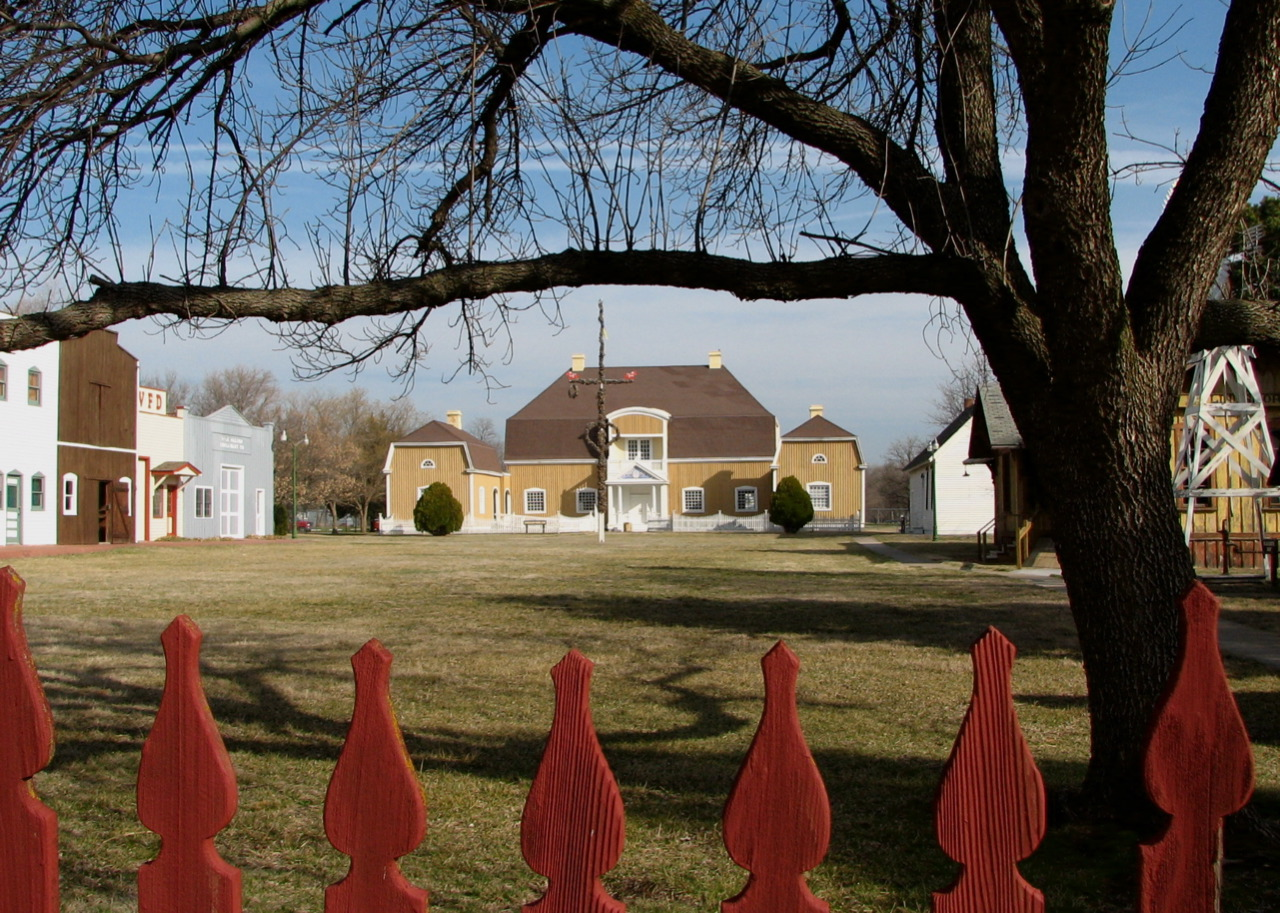

- Location within Kansas Location within the United States
- Location: Lindsborg, Kansas
- Coordinates: 38°34′3.2″N 97°40′29.3″W
- Built: 1904
- Architect: Ferdinand Boberg
- NRHP reference No.: 73002129
- Added to NRHP: March 20, 1973

Swedish Pavilion is a historic 1904 exposition building in Lindsborg, Kansas, United States. This building is contained on the grounds of the Lindsborg Old Mill & Swedish Heritage Museum at 120 Mill Street.

== History ==
Designed by Swedish architect Ferdinand Boberg, the Pavilion was built as an international exposition building for the 1904 Louisiana Purchase Exposition, also known as the St. Louis World's Fair. After the fair, the Pavilion was moved to Bethany College in Lindsborg, Kansas, where it was used for classroom, library, museum and department facilities for the art department.

The Swedish Pavilion was moved to the McPherson County Old Mill Museum, - now the Lindsborg Old Mill & Swedish Heritage Museum - also in Lindsborg, in 1969. The facility is used for cultural heritage events at the museum.

The Pavilion was added to the National Historic Register in 1973.

During the royal visit of Swedish King Carl XVI Gustaf to the United States in 1976, he toured the Swedish Pavilion as part of festivities in Lindsborg.
