= Rosberg-Holmgren-Clareen Block =

- U.S. National Register of Historic Places
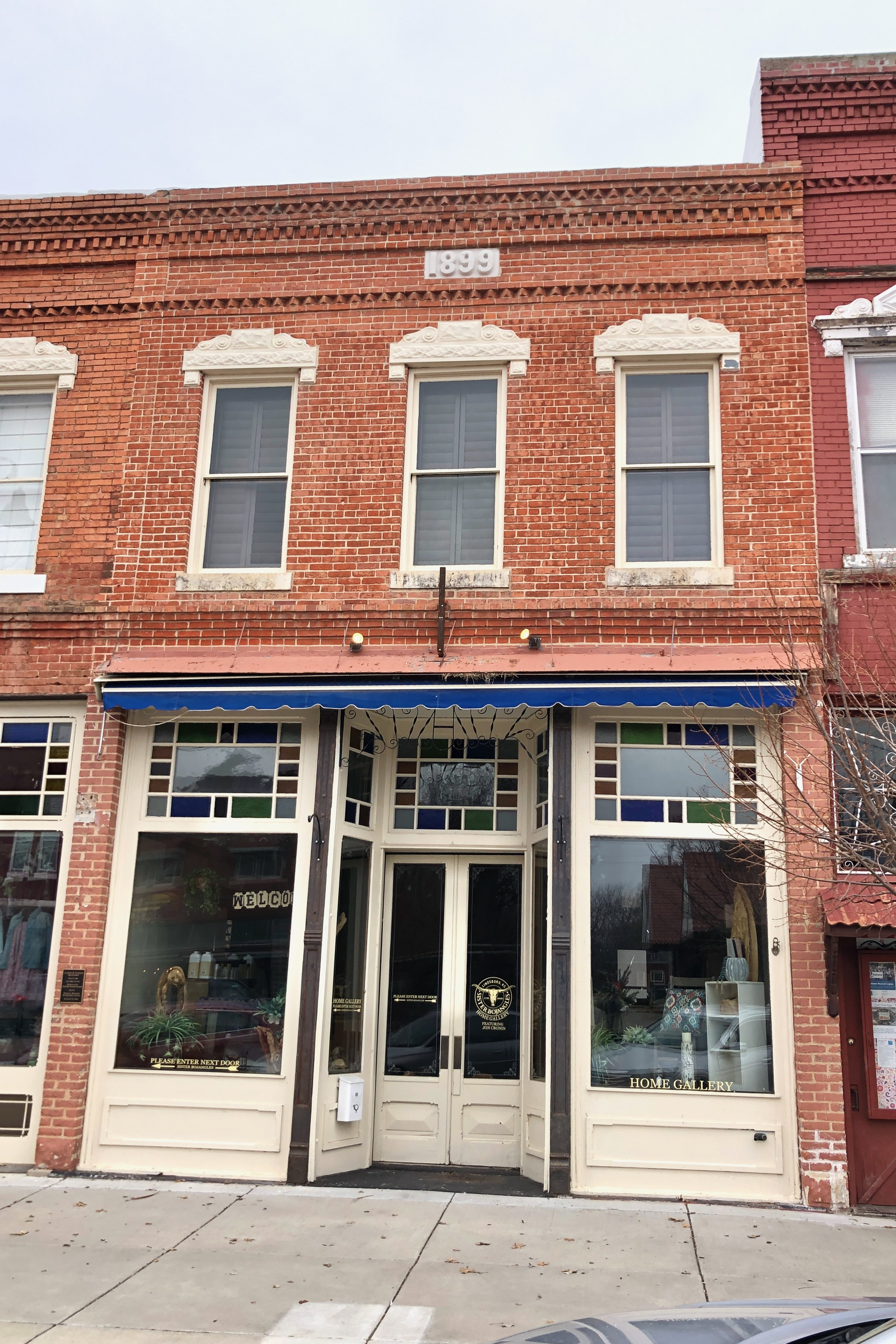
- Clareen Building

- Location within Kansas Location within the United States
- Location: 109-111-113 N. Main St., Lindsborg, Kansas
- Coordinates: 38°34′27″N 97°40′33″W
- Area: less than one acre
- Built: 1899
- Architectural style: Early Commercial
- NRHP reference No.: 09000229 (original); 16000706 (increase)

Significant dates
- Added to NRHP: April 22, 2009
- Boundary increase: October 11, 2016

The Rosberg-Holmgren-Clareen Block, also once known as the Clareen-Peterson Restaurant Building, is a historic building at 109-111-113 N. Main Street in Lindsborg, Kansas.

The building was built in 1899 for use as a restaurant with living quarters above by Swedish immigrant, Carl E. Clareen (1862-1923). By 1909, fellow Swedish immigrant John P. Peterson operated his restaurant known as the Royal Cafe on the first floor of the building. The first floor continued to serve as a restaurant through the 1940s. The building is of late Victorian style with Italianate detailing on its lower front exterior which includes cast iron columns.

The building has many distinguishing characteristics including the ornate second-story window hoods, cast-iron columns, the original storefront, and stained-glass windows. The building added to the National Register of Historic Places in 2009. Its listing was updated in 2016, resulting in a boundary increase and a renaming of the listing.
