= Smoky Valley Roller Mills =

- U.S. National Register of Historic Places
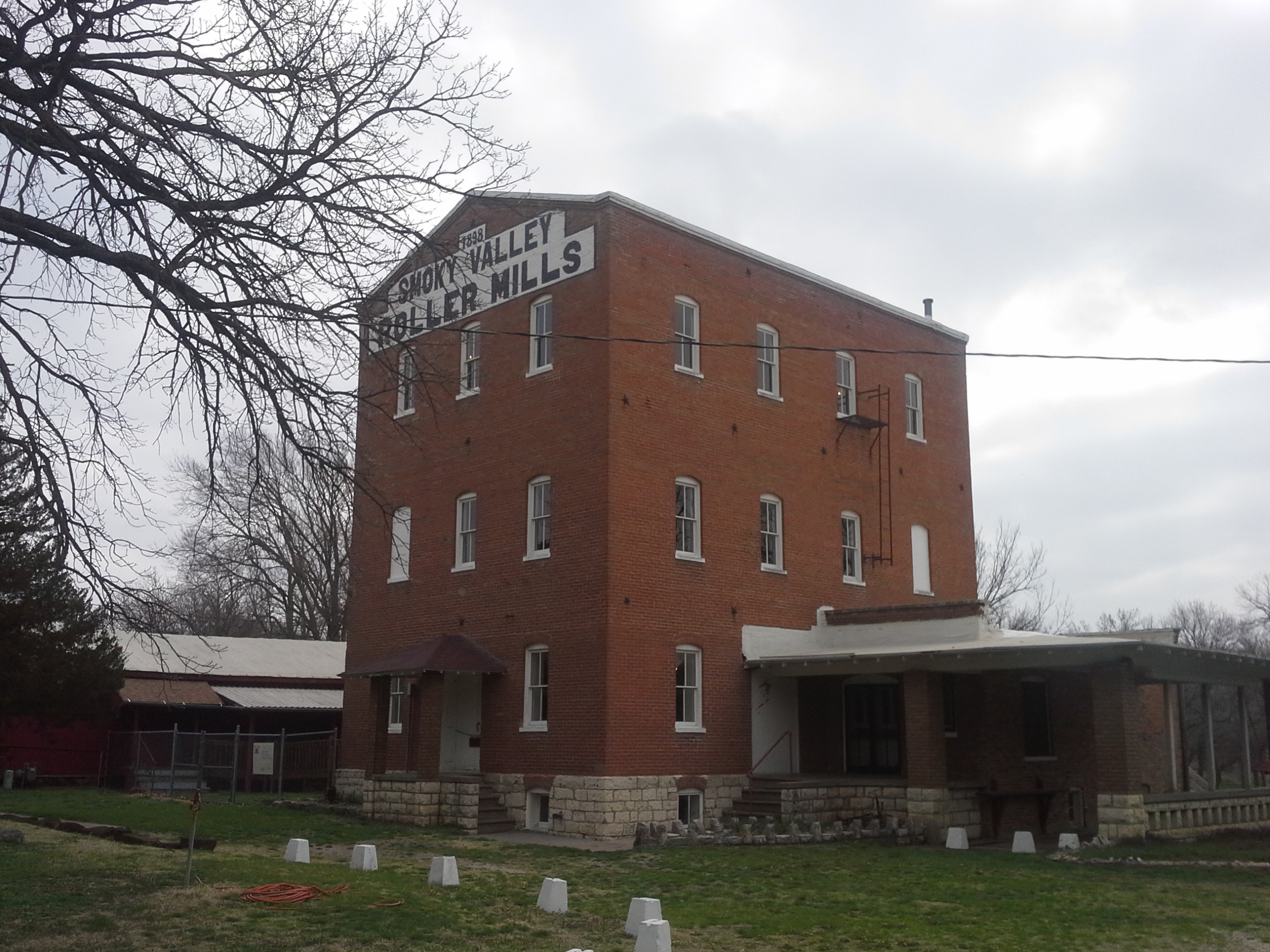

- Location within Kansas Location within the United States
- Location: Lindsborg, Kansas, U.S.
- Coordinates: 38°33′57″N 97°40′27″W
- Built: 1898
- NRHP reference No.: 72001451
- Added to NRHP: February 23, 1972

Smoky Valley Roller Mills, now known as the Lindsborg Old Mill & Swedish Heritage Museum, is an historic mill and museum on Mill Street in Lindsborg, Kansas.

== History ==
Smoky Valley Roller Mills was built in 1898 to make flour from wheat. The roller mill was operated by several different owners. It was closed temporarily 1927–1934, until closing for the last time as an active business in 1955. It was originally water powered, but converted to electricity in the 1930s. The building was given to McPherson County in 1962. Malcolm Esping of Lindsborg and George Tesarek, a retired Quaker Oats miller from St. Joseph, Mo. led the restoration of the building from 1974 to 1981.

The building is now part of a museum owned by a nonprofit organization formed in 2021. The museum grounds also include the 1904 World's Fair Swedish Pavilion and other buildings with local history exhibits, especially pertaining to Swedish-American history. The museum is open Monday-Saturday, year round, except for specific holidays. The mill building was added to the National Register of Historic Places in 1972. During Millfest, held annually in May, the machines in the mill are operated using line shafts powered by a large electric motor located outside the building.

== Gallery ==
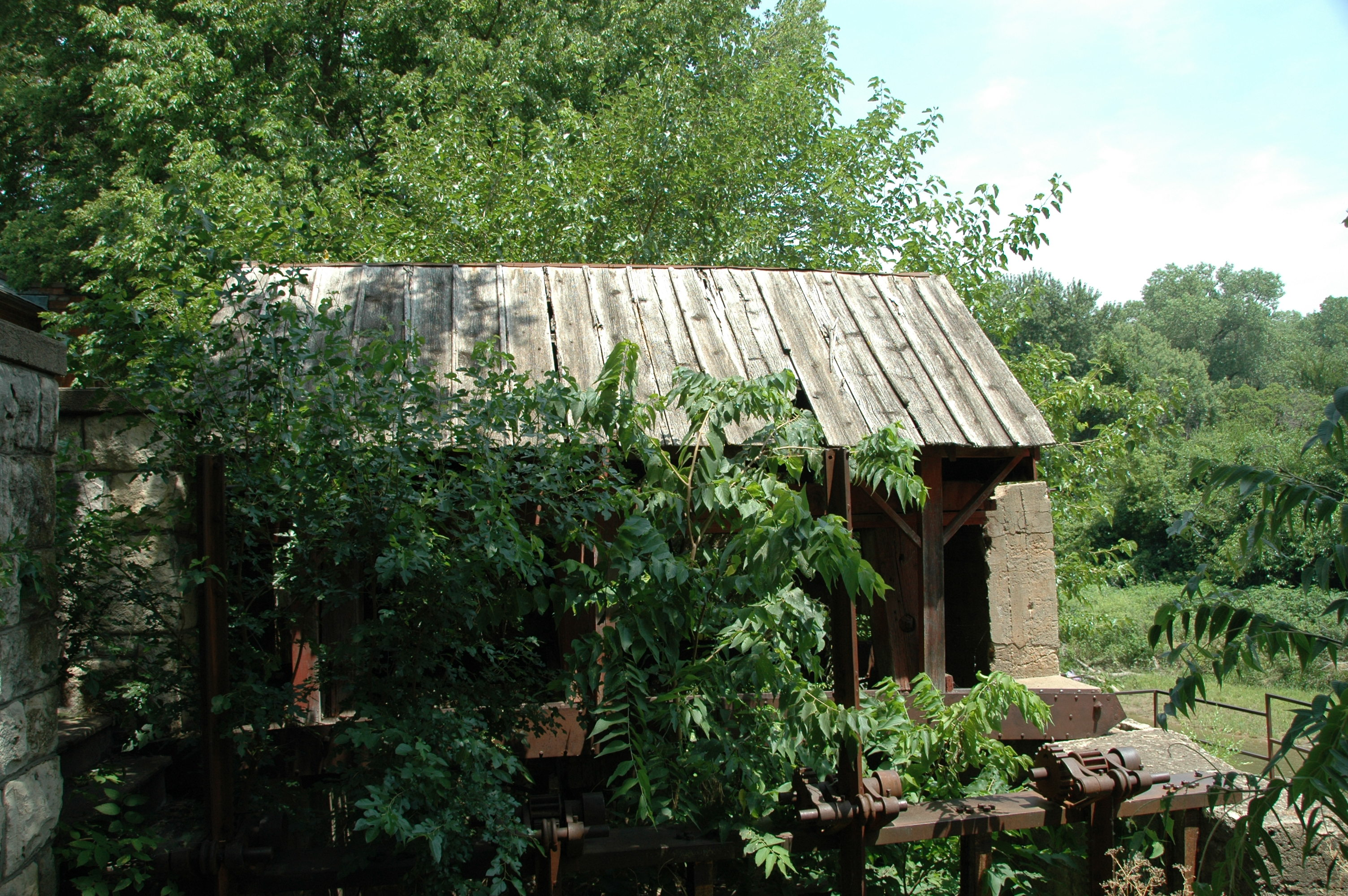
Turbine power house of Smoky Valley Roller Mills

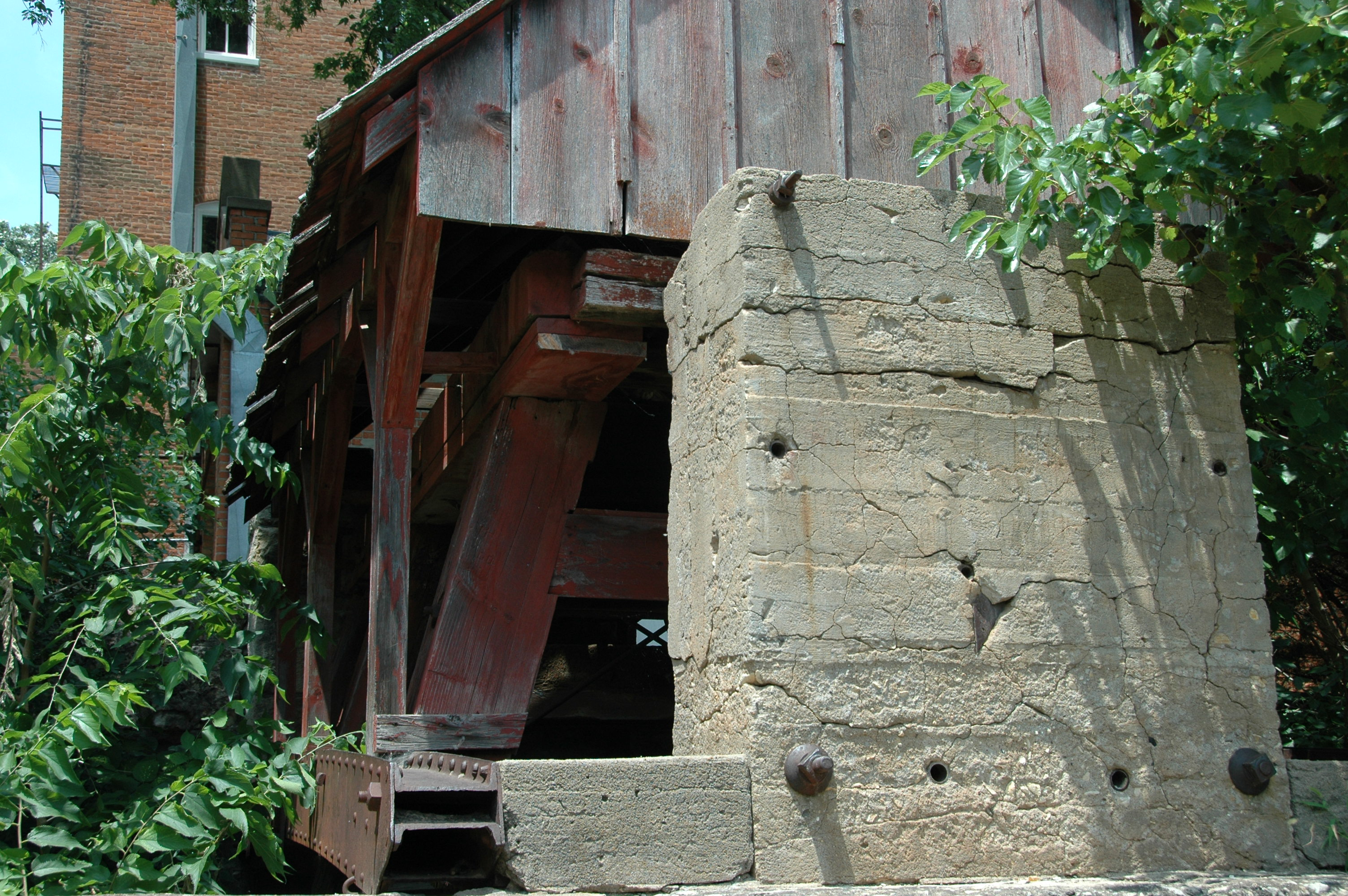
Turbine power house of Smoky Valley Roller Mills

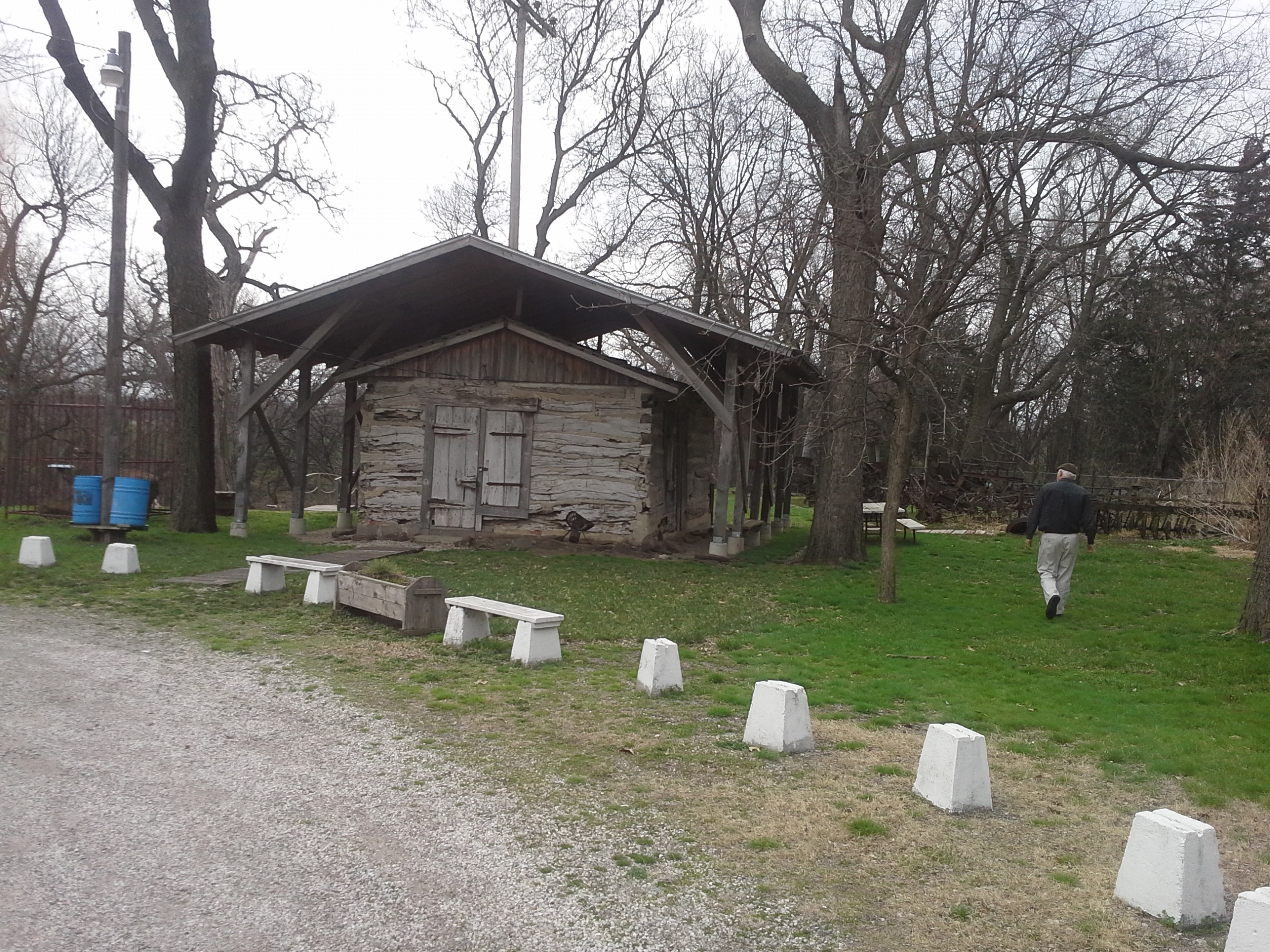
Log cabin at Lindsborg Old Mill & Swedish Heritage Museum

== Related reading ==
- Saul, Norman E. ( 2000) Mill Town Kansas in the Age of Turkey Red (Kansas Historical Society)
