= United States Post Office–Lindsborg =

- U.S. Post Office-Lindsborg
- U.S. National Register of Historic Places
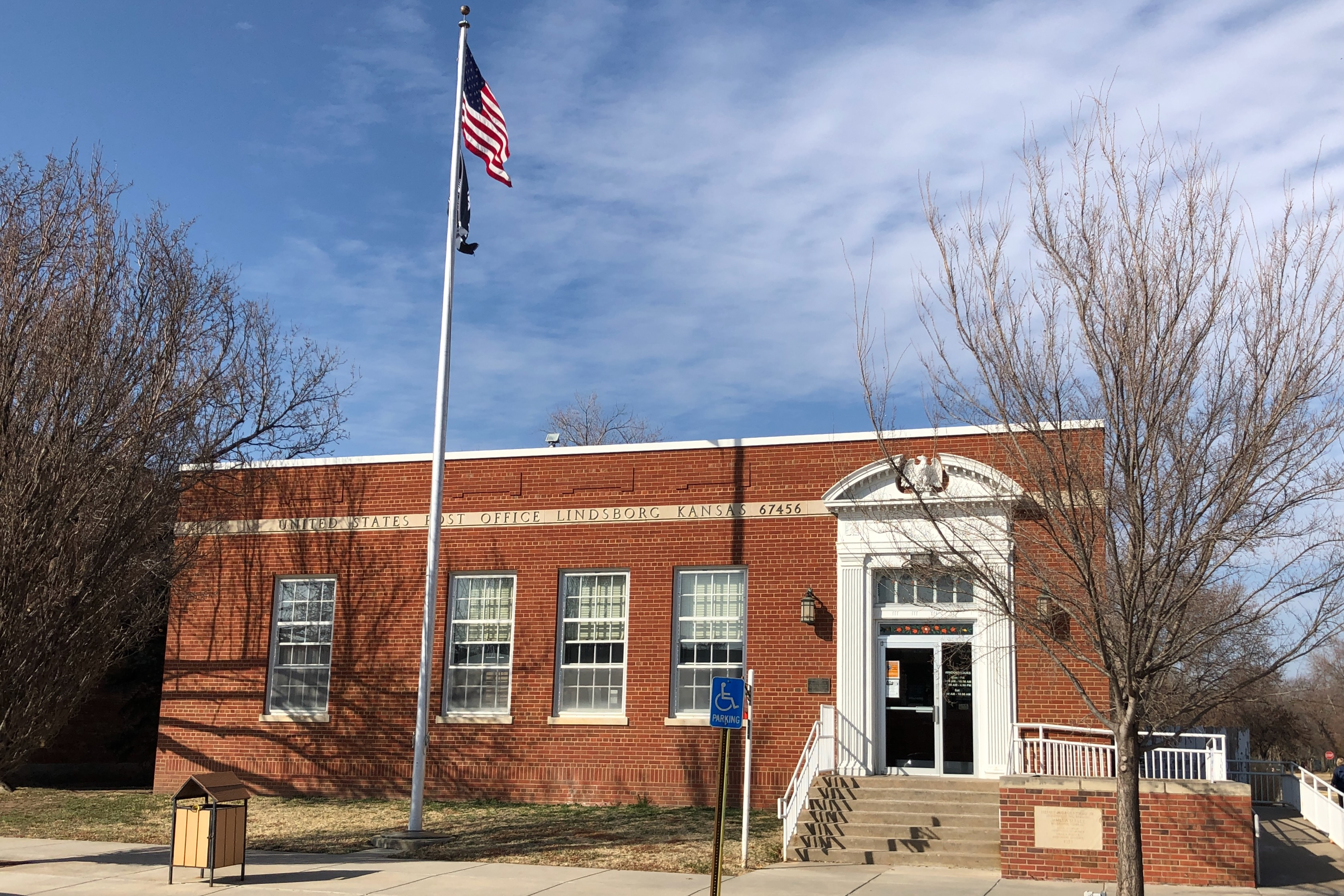

- Location within Kansas Location within the United States
- Location: Lindsborg, Kansas
- Coordinates: 38°34′27″N 97°39′50″W
- Built: 1938
- Architect: Louis Simon
- Architectural style: Classical Revival
- MPS: Kansas Post Offices with Artwork, 1936--1942 MPS
- NRHP reference No.: 89001646
- Added to NRHP: October 17, 1989

The U.S. Post Office-Lindsborg is a Classical Revival building at 125 East Lincoln Street in Lindsborg, Kansas. The post office building was constructed in 1938 and added to the National Historic Register in 1989. It is 68 by 55 feet (21 m × 17 m) in plan.

A depression-era WPA mural titled Smoky River by Swedish-born painter Birger Sandzen is in the lobby. The artist was paid $390 for the mural. Federally commissioned murals were produced from 1934 to 1943 in the United States through the Section of Painting and Sculpture, later called the Section of Fine Arts, of the Treasury Department.
