= Sharps Creek (Kansas) =

Stream in Kansas, U.S.

Coordinates: 38.5269519°N 97.7630984°W

Sharps Creek is a stream in McPherson County, Kansas and Rice County, Kansas, in the United States.

Sharps Creek was named for Isaac Sharp, a pioneer settler.

== See also ==
- Sharps Creek Site
- List of rivers of Kansas
