= Holmberg and Johnson Blacksmith Shop =

- U.S. National Register of Historic Places
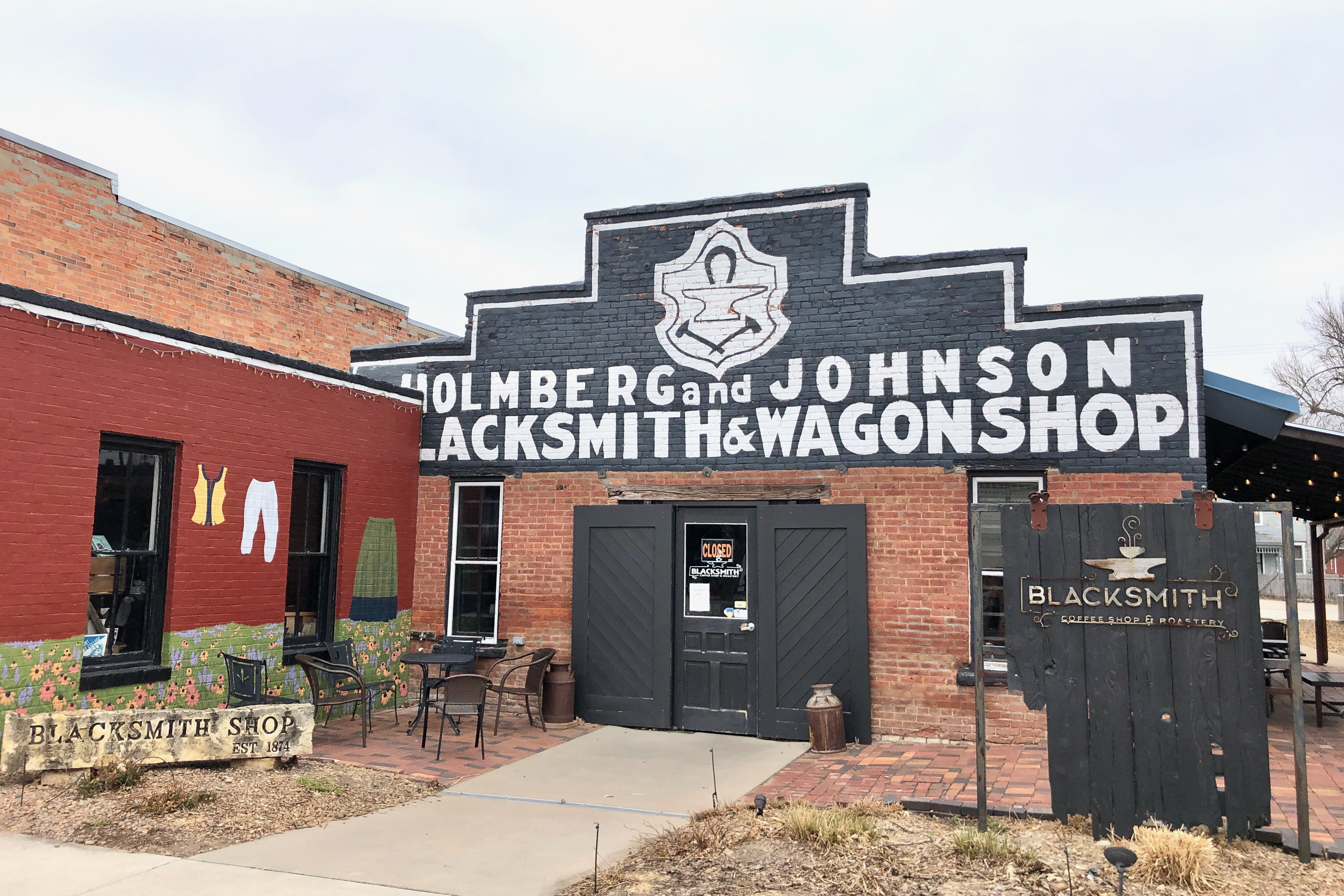

- Location within Kansas Location within the United States
- Location: 122 N. Main St., Lindsborg, Kansas
- Coordinates: 38°34′27″N 97°40′32″W
- Area: less than one acre
- Built: 1900
- Architectural style: 1 story, false front, other
- NRHP reference No.: 09000230
- Added to NRHP: April 22, 2009

The Holmberg and Johnson Blacksmith Shop is a historic building at 122 N. Main Street in downtown Lindsborg, Kansas. It was built in 1900 and added to the National Register of Historic Places in 2009.

It is an example of False front architecture. It is a one-story brick structure.

It was deemed notable " as a representative of early commercial businesses constructed by Swedish immigrants who founded the town of Lindsborg and is a rare example of a commercial building that retained its original use as a blacksmith shop nearly throughout its entire period of significance (1900-1954)."
