= Johnson House (Lindsborg, Kansas) =

Historic house in Kansas, United States

- U.S. National Register of Historic Places
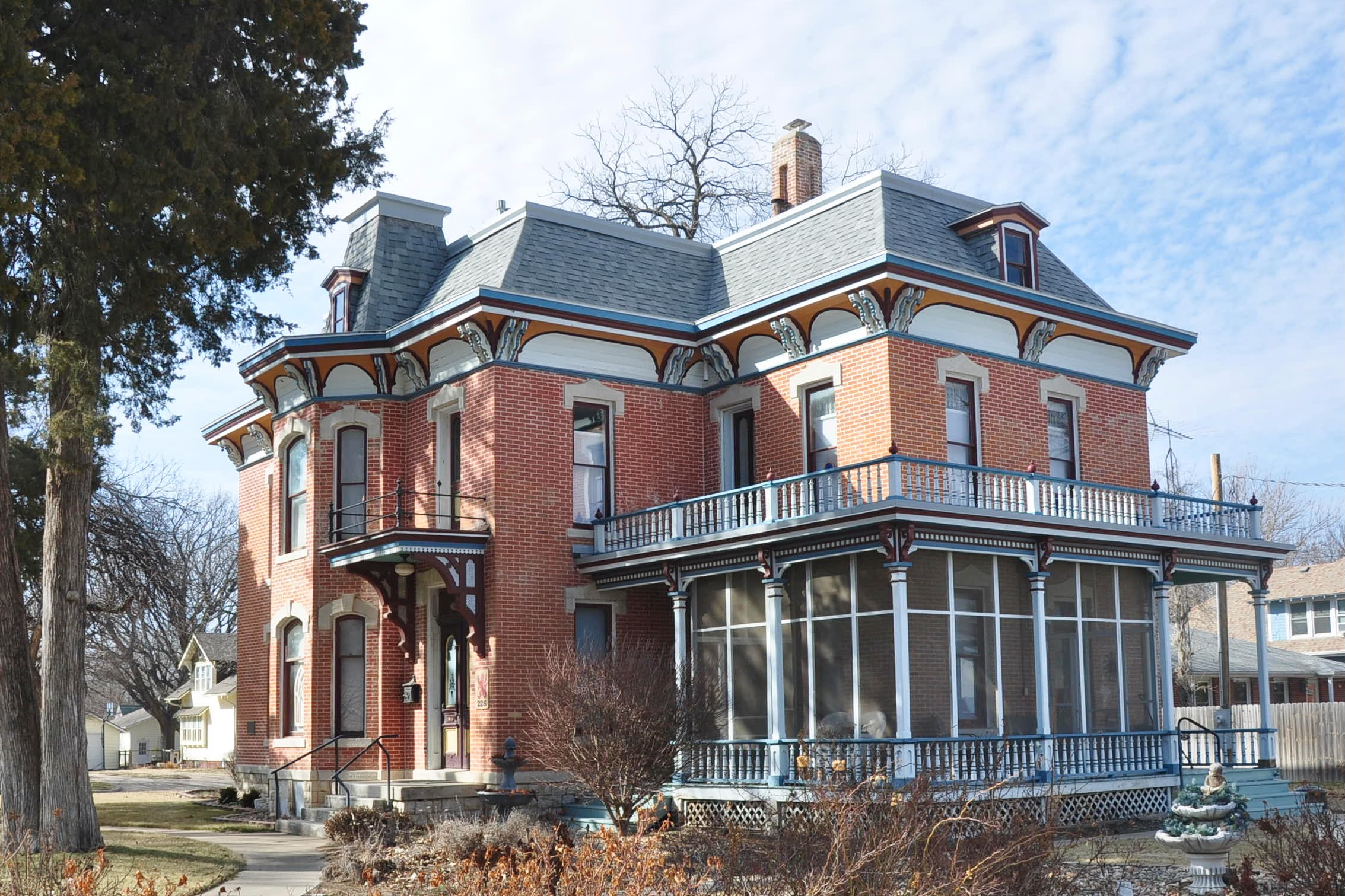

- Location within Kansas Location within the United States
- Location: 226 West Lincoln Street; Lindsborg, Kansas
- Coordinates: 38°34′51″N 97°40′43″W
- Area: 0.39 acres (0.16 ha)
- Built: 1887
- Architect: Carlson & Johnson
- Architectural style: Second Empire
- NRHP reference No.: 98000251
- Added to NRHP: March 19, 1998

The Johnson House is a historic house located at 226 West Lincoln Street in Lindsborg, Kansas.

== Description and history ==
The brick, two-story, Second Empire style house was built from the spring to the summer of 1887, and was originally built as the residence of Dan Johnson. It sits on a plot of 0.39 acres of land. The D. Johnson house was a source of community pride and its construction seemed at times to be viewed almost as an obligation of the merchant to his community. It was added to the National Historic Register on March 19, 1998.
