= Teichgraeber–Runbeck House =

Historic house in Kansas, United States

- U.S. National Register of Historic Places
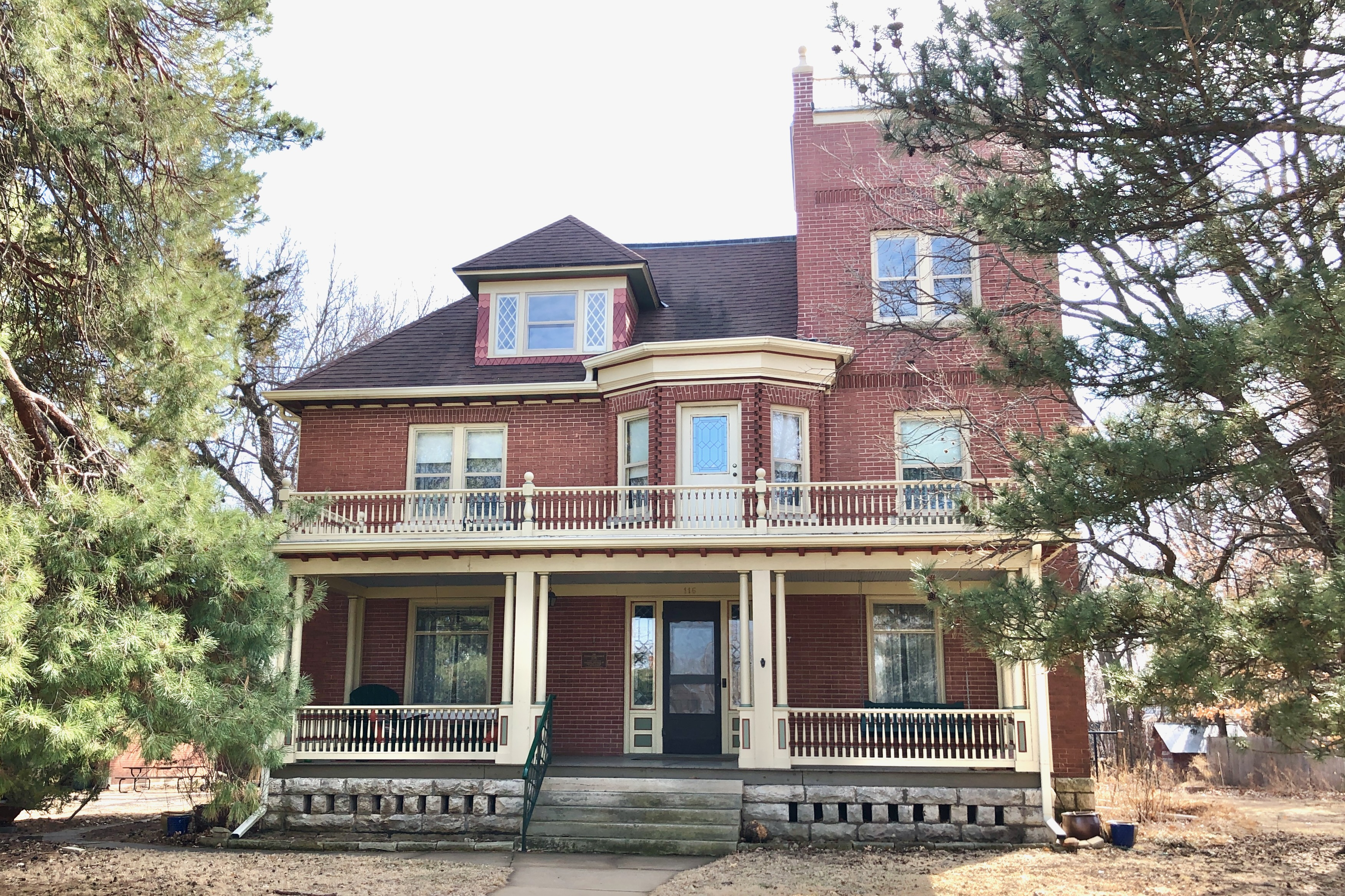

- Location within Kansas Location within the United States
- Location: 116 Mill St. Lindsborg, Kansas
- Coordinates: 38°33′57″N 97°40′29″W
- Built: 1906–07
- Architectural style: Queen Anne
- NRHP reference No.: 05001239
- Added to NRHP: November 15, 2005

The Teichgraeber–Runbeck House is a historic Queen Anne-style house at 116 Mill Street in Lindsborg, Kansas. It was built during 1906–07 and added to the National Register of Historic Places in 2005.

It is a three-story brick house built on a limestone foundation.

It was deemed notable "for its historical association with the Smoky Valley Roller Mill and ... for its architectural significance as an example of a Queen Anne residence."
