= John R. Wright House =

Historic house in Kansas, United States

- U.S. National Register of Historic Places
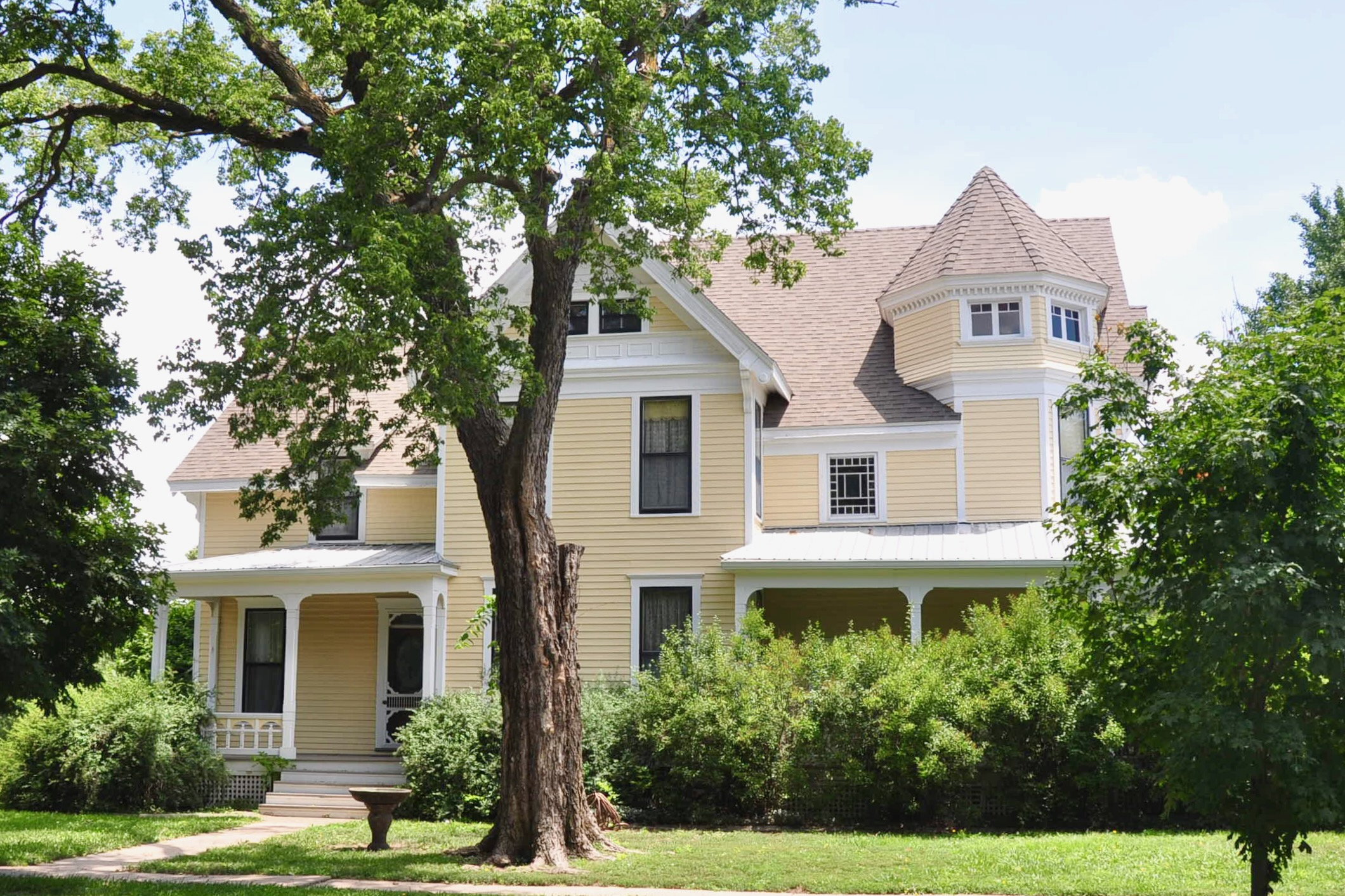

- Location within Kansas Location within the United States
- Location: 322 West Marlin Street, McPherson, Kansas
- Coordinates: 38°22′14″N 97°40′13″W
- Built: 1887
- Architect: Srackengast, F.A.
- Architectural style: Queen Anne
- NRHP reference No.: 02000427
- Added to NRHP: May 2, 2002

John R. Wright House is a historic Queen Anne-style house at 322 West Marlin Street in McPherson, Kansas, United States. The house was built in 1887 and added to the National Historic Register in 2002.

John R. Wright (1841-1926) was born in New Jersey, grew up in Cincinnati, Ohio, and served in the American Civil War, losing his left arm in the battle of Fayetteville, West Virginia. He later became a homesteader and businessman in Kansas, and eventually served as County Clerk and also as a Postmaster.

The house was deemed notable "for its historical association with John R. Wright and for its architectural significance as a Queen Anne Revival residence."
