= Sharpe Creek =

Stream in Georgia, USA

Coordinates: 33°37′50.39″N 85°2′55.80″W

Sharpe Creek is a stream in the U.S. state of Georgia. It is a tributary to the Little Tallapoosa River.

Sharpe Creek derives its name from Uncle Hiram Sharp, a pioneer settler. A variant name is "Sharps Creek".
