= Kuns–Collier House =

Historic house in Kansas, United States

- U.S. National Register of Historic Places
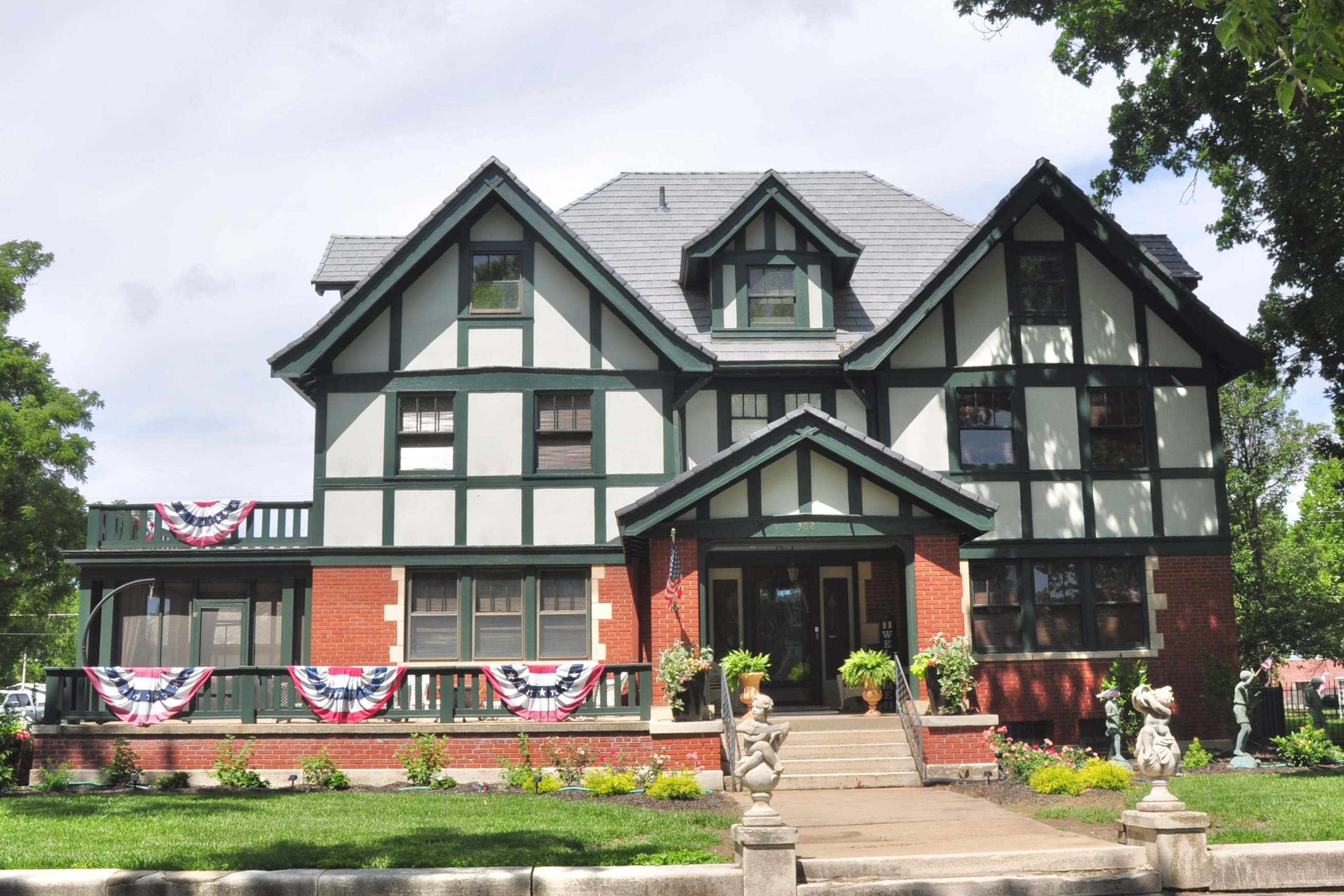

- Location within Kansas Location within the United States
- Location: 302 S. Walnut Street, McPherson, Kansas
- Coordinates: 38°22′1″N 97°40′10″W
- Area: 0.49 acres (0.20 ha)
- Built: 1909
- Architect: Van Brunt, Adriance & Bro.; Scrackengast, Frank
- Architectural style: Tudor Revival
- NRHP reference No.: 06000114
- Added to NRHP: March 08, 2006

Kuns–Collier House is a historic house located at 302 S. Walnut Street in McPherson, Kansas. It is locally significant as an example of the Tudor Revival style of architecture.

== Description and history ==
The two-story, half-timbered Tudor Revival style house was built in 1909. It sits on a 0.49-acre plot of land. It was added to the National Register of Historic Places on March 8, 2006.
