= Lindsborg, Kansas =

City in McPherson County, Kansas

- City
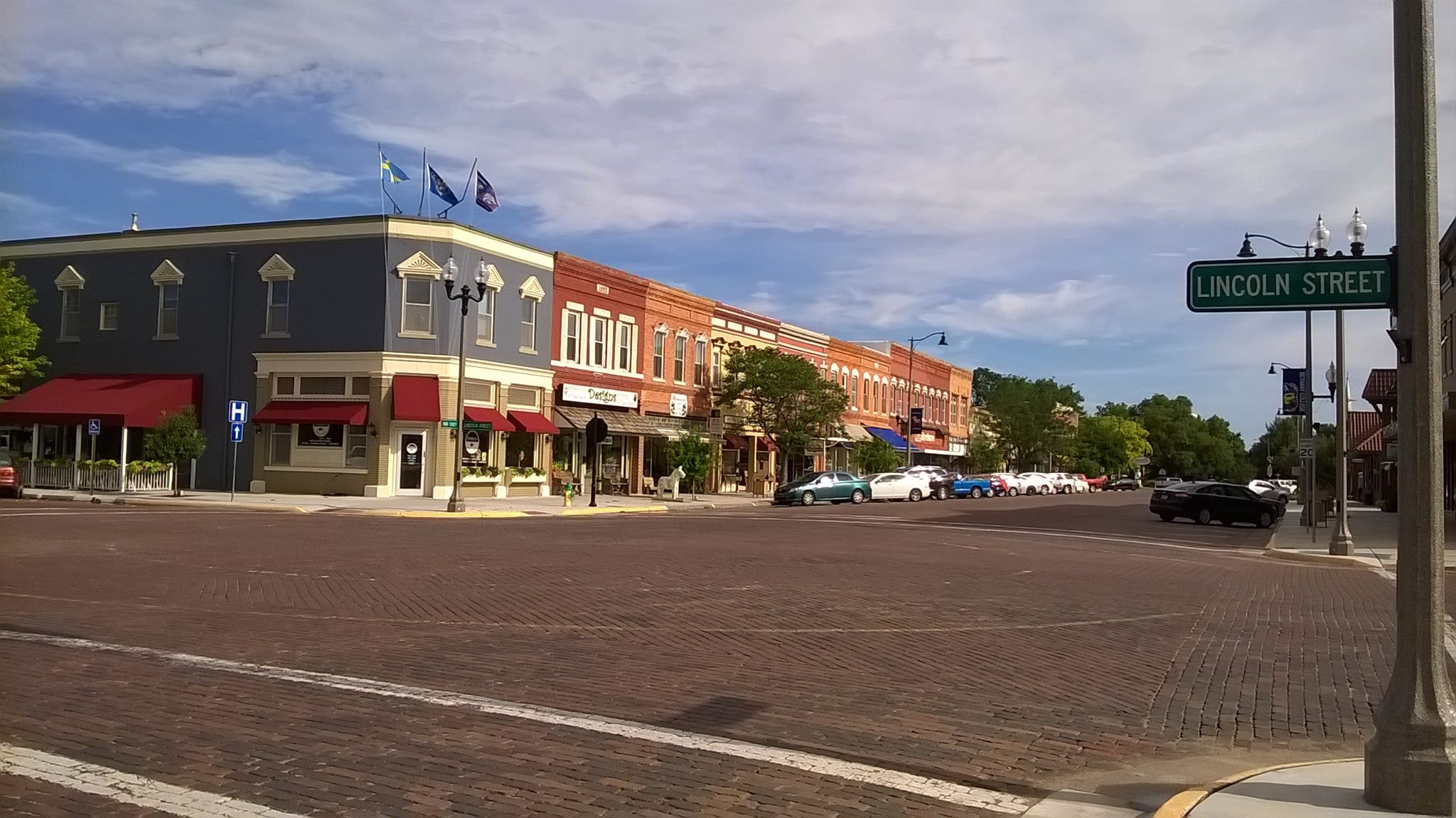
- Intersection of Lincoln and Main streets (2016)
- Nickname: Little Sweden
- Location within McPherson County and Kansas

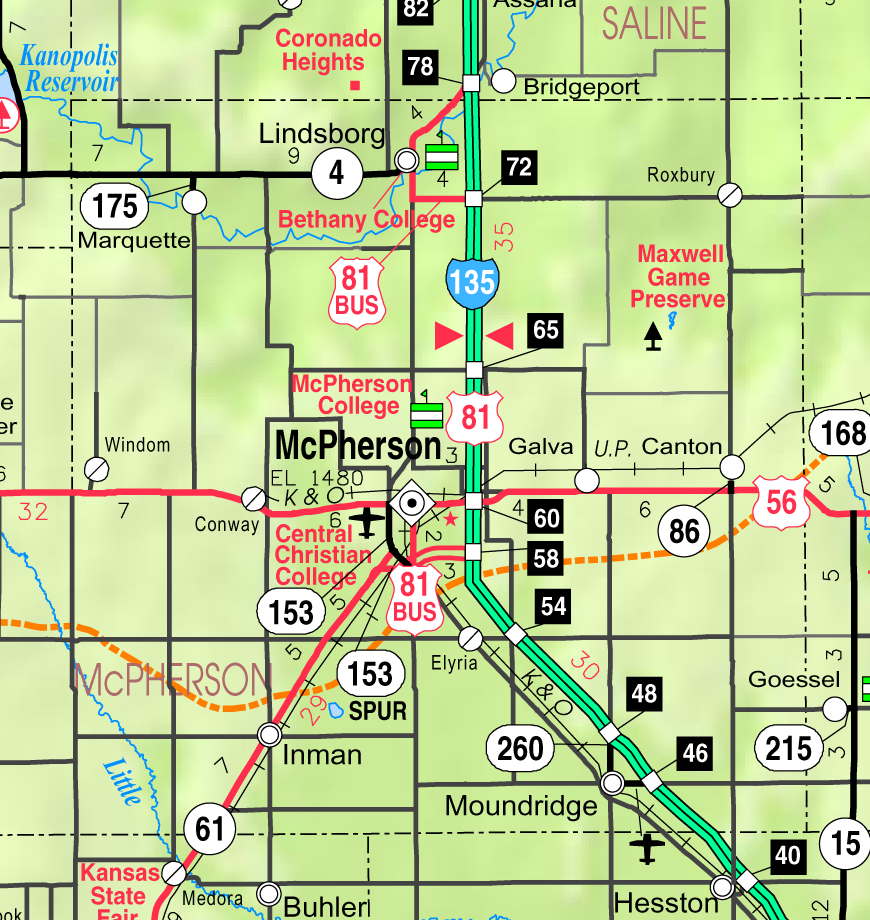
- KDOT map of McPherson County (legend)
- Coordinates: 38°34′38″N 97°40′26″W
- Country: United States
- State: Kansas
- County: McPherson
- Founded: 1869
- Incorporated: 1879
- Named for: Linden Castle

Area
  - Total: 1.85 sq mi (4.78 km^{2})
  - Land: 1.83 sq mi (4.74 km^{2})
  - Water: 0.015 sq mi (0.04 km^{2})
- Elevation: 1,332 ft (406 m)

Population (2020)
  - Total: 3,776
  - Density: 2,060/sq mi (797/km^{2})
- Time zone: UTC-6 (CST)
  - Summer (DST): UTC-5 (CDT)
- ZIP Code: 67456
- Area code: 785
- FIPS code: 20-41375
- GNIS ID: 485614
- Website: lindsborgcity.org

Lindsborg is a city in McPherson County, Kansas, United States. As of the 2020 census, its population was 3,776. Lindsborg is known for its large Swedish and other Nordic and Scandinavian heritages. It is home to the biennial Svensk Hyllningsfest.

== History ==
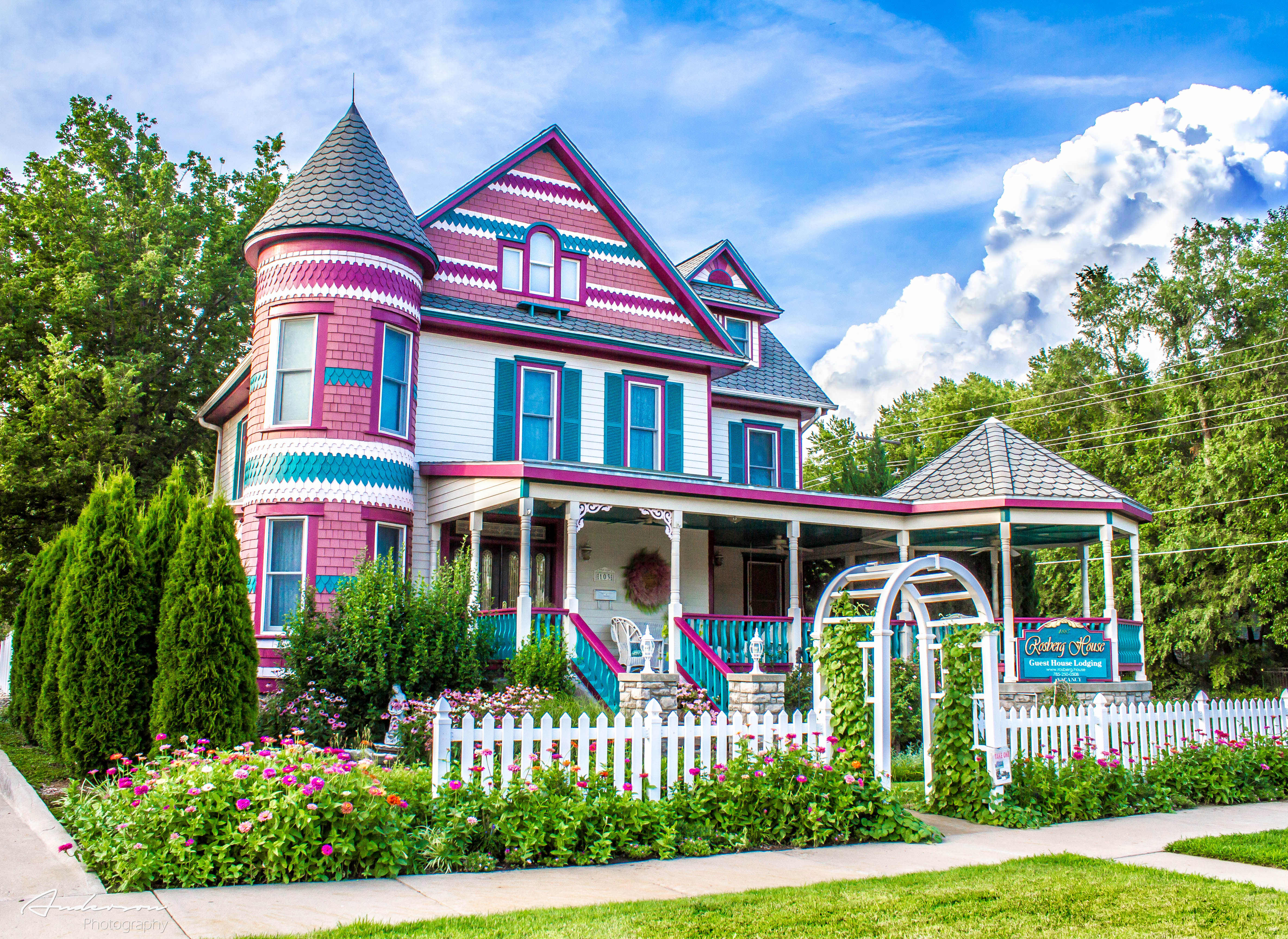
A home in Lindsborg (2016)

For many millennia, the Great Plains of North America were inhabited by nomadic Native Americans. From the 16th to the 18th century, the Kingdom of France claimed ownership of large parts of North America. In 1762, after the French and Indian War, France secretly ceded New France to Spain, per the Treaty of Fontainebleau. In 1802, Spain returned most of the land to France. In 1803, the land for modern day Kansas was acquired by the United States from France for 2.83 cents per acre as part of the 828,000 square-mile Louisiana Purchase.

In 1854, the Kansas Territory was organized and in 1861 Kansas became the 34th U.S. state. McPherson County, which included the land for the future Lindsborg, was established in 1867. Lindsborg was settled in the spring of 1869 by a group of immigrants from the Värmland province of Sweden led by Pastor Olof Olsson. In 1879, the same year Lindsborg incorporated as a city, the first railroad came through.

Lindsborg translates as Linden Fort from Swedish to English, referring to a tree name known in Europe for a species of tilia (Swedish: lind). The community is named for four men whose surnames included "Lind", N. P. Linde, S. P. Lindgren, S. A. Lindell, and J. O. Lindh, who had held prominent positions in a Chicago organization of Swedish farmers (Svenska Lantbrukskompaniet or First Swedish Agricultural Company) which was involved in the settling of Lindsborg until 1877.

Thirty percent of the current residents are of Swedish descent. Because the town has retained so much of the heritage of its founders, it has become known as "Little Sweden". The downtown features gift shops that specialize in Swedish souvenirs, including various sizes of Dala horses. Lindsborg has long been noted for the Svensk Hyllningsfest, a biennial celebration held in October of odd-numbered years since 1941, and other efforts to honor its heritage.

Lindsborg is the home of the Swedish Pavilion, which was originally constructed as an international exposition building for the 1904 St. Louis World's Fair. After the fair, it was purchased by W. W. Thomas, U.S. Minister to Sweden and Norway, and presented to Lindsborg's Bethany College as a memorial to his friend Dr. Rev. Carl Aaron Swensson, the school's recently deceased founder. At Bethany, it was used by the art department as a classroom, library, and museum. It was moved to the Lindsborg Old Mill & Swedish Heritage Museum, also in Lindsborg, in 1969.

The Birger Sandzén Memorial Gallery is located in Lindsborg. Dedicated on October 20, 1957, on the Bethany College campus, it showcases the works of the artist Birger Sandzén who lived in the city. The gallery houses the largest and most extensive collection of his paintings, prints, and drawings found anywhere in the world.

Swedish King Carl XVI Gustaf visited Lindsborg in April 1976 during his royal tour of the United States.

In 2004, Lindsborg was named Chess City of the Year by the United States Chess Federation.

== Geography ==
According to the United States Census Bureau, the city has a total area of 1.69 square miles (4.38 km^{2}), of which 1.67 square miles (4.33 km^{2}) is land and 0.02 square miles (0.05 km^{2}) is water.

=== Climate ===
The climate in this area is characterized by hot, humid summers and generally mild to cool winters. According to the Köppen Climate Classification system, Lindsborg has a humid subtropical climate, abbreviated "Cfa" on climate maps.

== Demographics ==
Historical population
Census	Pop.	Note	%±
1880	466		—
1890	968		107.7%
1900	1,279		32.1%
1910	1,939		51.6%
1920	1,897		−2.2%
1930	2,016		6.3%
1940	1,913		−5.1%
1950	2,383		24.6%
1960	2,609		9.5%
1970	2,764		5.9%
1980	3,155		14.1%
1990	3,076		−2.5%
2000	3,321		8.0%
2010	3,458		4.1%
2020	3,776		9.2%
U.S. Decennial Census

=== 2020 census ===
As of the 2020 census, there were 3,776 people, 1,346 households, and 838 families in Lindsborg. The population density was 2,060.0 per square mile (795.4/km^{2}). There were 1,469 housing units at an average density of 801.4 per square mile (309.4/km^{2}).

The median age was 38.8 years. 17.5% of residents were under the age of 18, 21.0% were from 18 to 24, 18.0% were from 25 to 44, 20.3% were from 45 to 64, and 23.2% were 65 years of age or older. For every 100 females, there were 90.3 males, and for every 100 females age 18 and over, there were 88.1 males age 18 and over.

0.0% of residents lived in urban areas, while 100.0% lived in rural areas.

Of the 1,346 households, 25.9% had children under age 18 living in them. Of all households, 51.0% were married-couple households, 17.0% were households with a male householder and no spouse or partner present, and 27.4% were households with a female householder and no spouse or partner present. About 32.0% of all households were made up of individuals, and 16.3% had someone living alone who was 65 years of age or older. Of the 1,469 housing units, 8.4% were vacant; the homeowner vacancy rate was 1.2% and the rental vacancy rate was 10.5%.

Racial composition as of the 2020 census
Race	Number	Percent
White	3,314	87.8%
Black or African American	98	2.6%
American Indian and Alaska Native	13	0.3%
Asian	18	0.5%
Native Hawaiian and Other Pacific Islander	1	0.0%
Some other race	121	3.2%
Two or more races	211	5.6%
Hispanic or Latino (of any race)	226	6.0%

=== Demographic estimates ===
The average household size was 2.2 and the average family size was 3.0. The percent of those with a bachelor's degree or higher was estimated to be 23.1% of the population.

=== Income and poverty ===
The 2016–2020 5-year American Community Survey estimates show that the median household income was $54,500 (with a margin of error of +/- $11,380) and the median family income was $76,055 (+/- $5,526). Males had a median income of $36,912 (+/- $9,433) versus $24,500 (+/- $10,517) for females. The median income for those above 16 years old was $26,383 (+/- $2,680). Approximately, 3.3% of families and 9.8% of the population were below the poverty line, including 5.9% of those under the age of 18 and 7.7% of those ages 65 or over.

=== 2010 census ===
As of the census of 2010, there were 3,458 people, 1,303 households, and 829 families residing in the city. The population density was 2,070.7 inhabitants per square mile (799.5/km^{2}). There were 1,414 housing units at an average density of 846.7 per square mile (326.9/km^{2}). The racial makeup of the city was 94.8% White, 1.7% African American, 0.1% Native American, 0.5% Asian, 0.1% Pacific Islander, 0.8% from other races, and 2.1% from two or more races. Hispanic or Latino people of any race were 3.5% of the population.

There were 1,303 households, of which 28.1% had children under the age of 18 living with them, 52.3% were married couples living together, 8.4% had a female householder with no husband present, 2.9% had a male householder with no wife present, and 36.4% were non-families. 31.1% of all households were made up of individuals, and 15.7% had someone living alone who was 65 years of age or older. The average household size was 2.31 and the average family size was 2.88.

The median age in the city was 37.8 years. 20.3% of residents were under the age of 18; 17.4% were between the ages of 18 and 24; 18.7% were from 25 to 44; 23.6% were from 45 to 64; and 19.9% were 65 years of age or older. The gender makeup of the city was 47.5% male and 52.5% female.

== Arts and culture ==
=== Area events ===
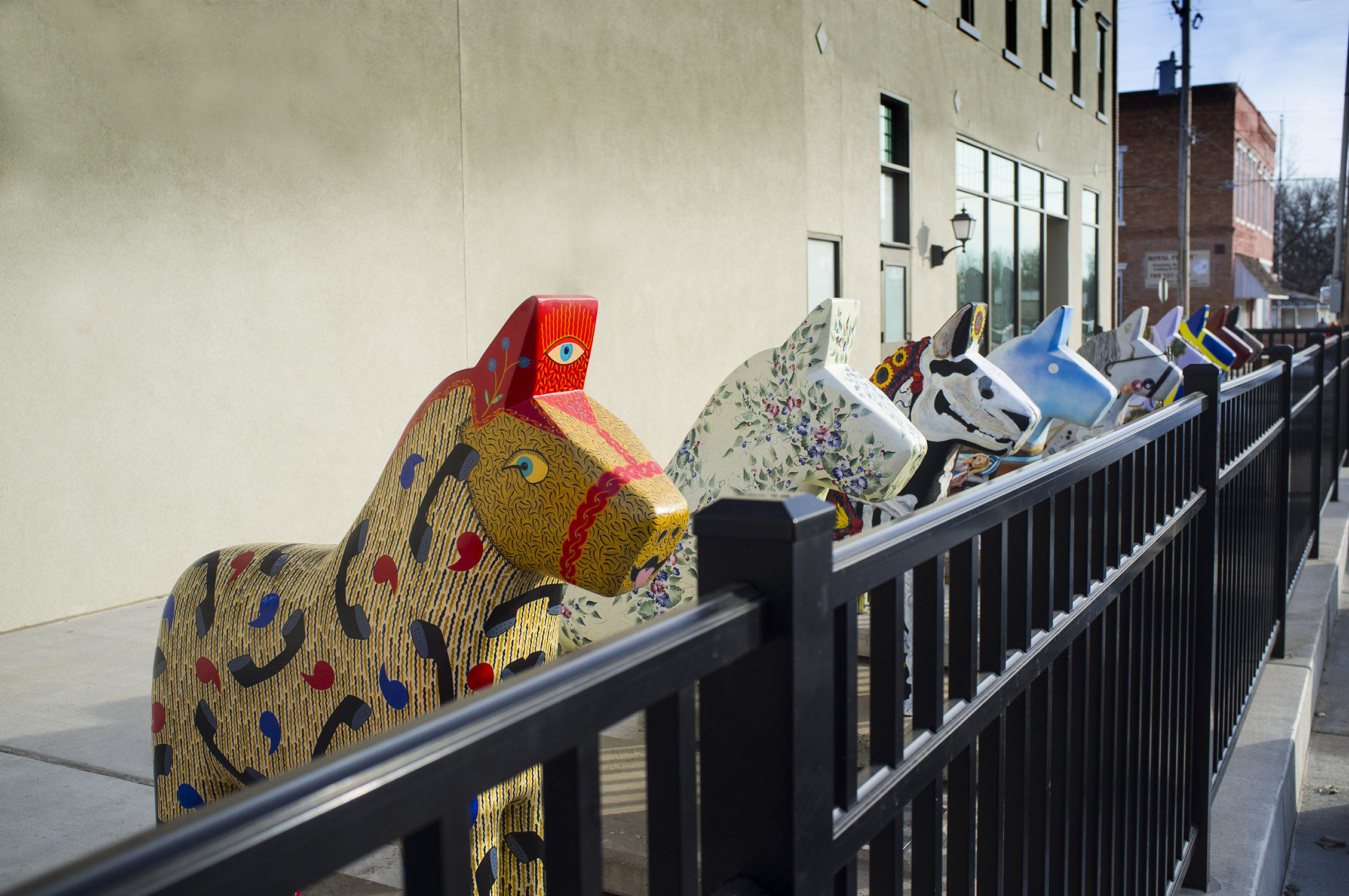
Lindsborg sports a herd of more than 30 "Wild Dala horses" that can be found throughout town, each custom painted by local artists (2015).

- Chocolate Lovers Affair & Art Auction is an annual February fundraiser in support of a vibrant arts community and graduates pursuing art.
- Våffeldagen or Waffle Day is celebrated annually in March.
- Messiah Festival of the Arts is a comprehensive arts festival concluding with a full-length performance of Handel's Messiah as established in 1881.
- Lindsborg City-Wide Garage Sale is an annual yard sale in May for residents and visitors alike.
- Millfest is an annual festival on the first Saturday in May featuring historic sites, folk music, woodcarving, wheat and fiber art weaving, and old fashioned games and activities.
- Midsummer annual summer solstice festival
- Smoky Valley Classic Car Show
- Lindsborg Street Dance is an annual summer evening dance party featuring live music.
- Coronado Heights Run is an annual event in October featuring a kids fun walk, 5K, and 15K on scenic country roads.
- The Falun Classic Bike Ride is an annual 32-mile bicycle ride in October.
- Svensk Hyllningsfest is a biannual tribute to the Swedish pioneers occurring in October of odd-numbered years.
- Christmas in Lindsborg is a month-long series of events in December including the Snowflake Parade, Artist Open Studios, a St. Lucia Festival, Heritage Christmas, Julotta, and Annandag Jul among other entertainment and shopping events.

=== Area attractions ===
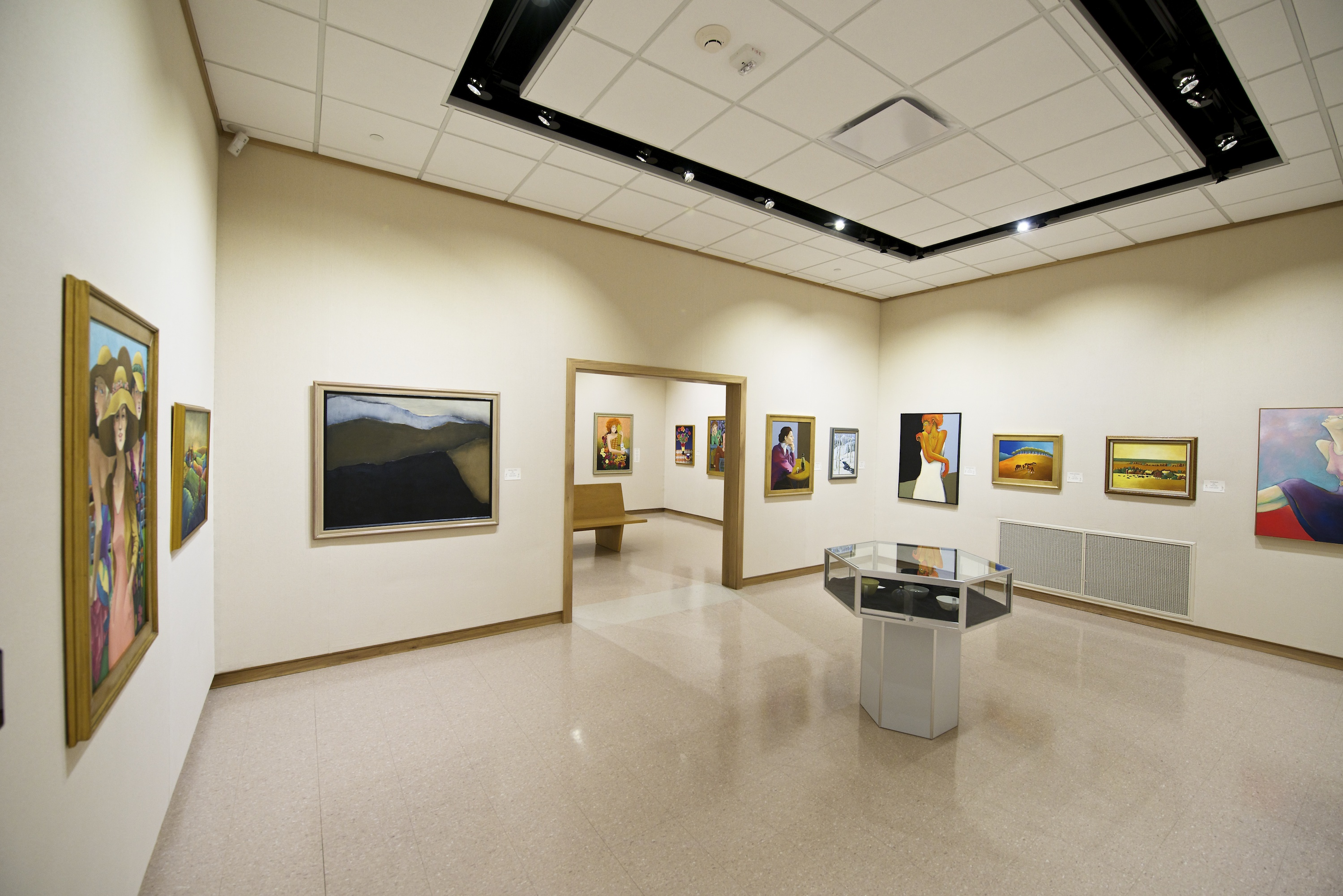
The Birger Sandzén Memorial Gallery features the work of artist Birger Sandzén as well as other collections of fine art in their shows throughout the year (2012).

- Birger Sandzén Memorial Gallery
- Red Barn Studio Museum
- Clara Hatton Center (art museum and event space)
- Smoky Valley Arts and Folk Life Center
- Coronado Heights
- Smoky Valley Roller Mill
- Broadway RFD (Kansas's longest-running outdoor theater, established in 1959)
- International Chess Institute of the Midwest, formerly known as the Anatoly Karpov International School of Chess
- Swedish Pavilion historic site
- Historic Homes Tour

== Education ==
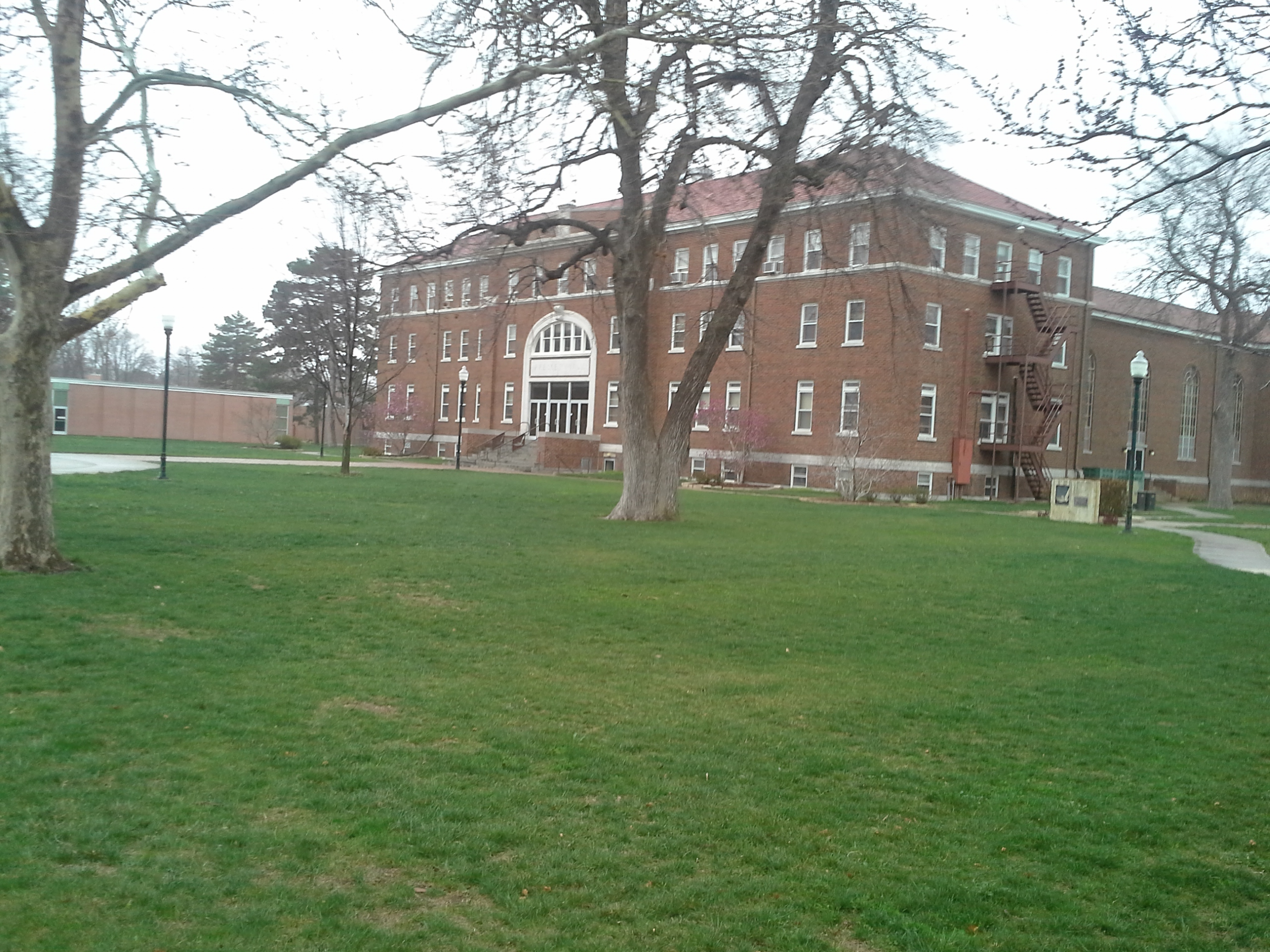
Bethany College (2013)

=== Primary and secondary education ===
The community is served by Smoky Valley USD 400 public school district. Lindsborg is the home of:

- Smoky Valley High School
- Smoky Valley Middle School
- Soderstrom Elementary

=== College ===
- Bethany College

=== Other ===
- The International Chess School of the Midwest, formerly called the Anatoly Karpov International School of Chess, is located downtown.

== Transportation ==
K-4 highway passes through Lindsborg. Bus service is provided daily towards Wichita and Salina by BeeLine Express (subcontractor of Greyhound Lines).

The railroad depot located in Heritage Square formerly served passenger and freight trains of the Union Pacific Railroad along a route from Salina to McPherson. The depot was built in 1879 by the Kansas Pacific Railway with the first train arriving on July 4, 1879. The depot served multiple daily passenger trains until at least 1929. Thereafter, mixed trains provided service until at least 1959. The depot closed to freight service in 1972 and was relocated to the museum in 1974.

An additional railroad depot served Missouri Pacific trains between St. Louis and Pueblo. Passenger service on this line ended on April 2, 1966 and the depot was subsequently demolished.

As of 2025, the nearest passenger rail station is located in Newton, where Amtrak's Southwest Chief stops once daily on a route from Chicago to Los Angeles.

Bikeshare opened in Lindsborg on June 30, 2023. KANcycle launched three locations in the city with bikes available through the Movatic app.

== Notable people ==
- Jay Emler, former Kansas Senate majority leader from 2011 to 2014, former District 35 senator from 2001 to 2014, previously a Lindsborg municipal judge
- Ted Kessinger, retired college football coach, member of College Football Hall of Fame
- Ebba Nylander, violinist and conductor born in Lindsborg
- John W. Peterson, Gospel songwriter born in Lindsborg
- Birger Sandzén, Swedish-born painter and teacher
- Lester Raymer, prolific painter, printmaker, and craftsman of all mediums

== Gallery ==
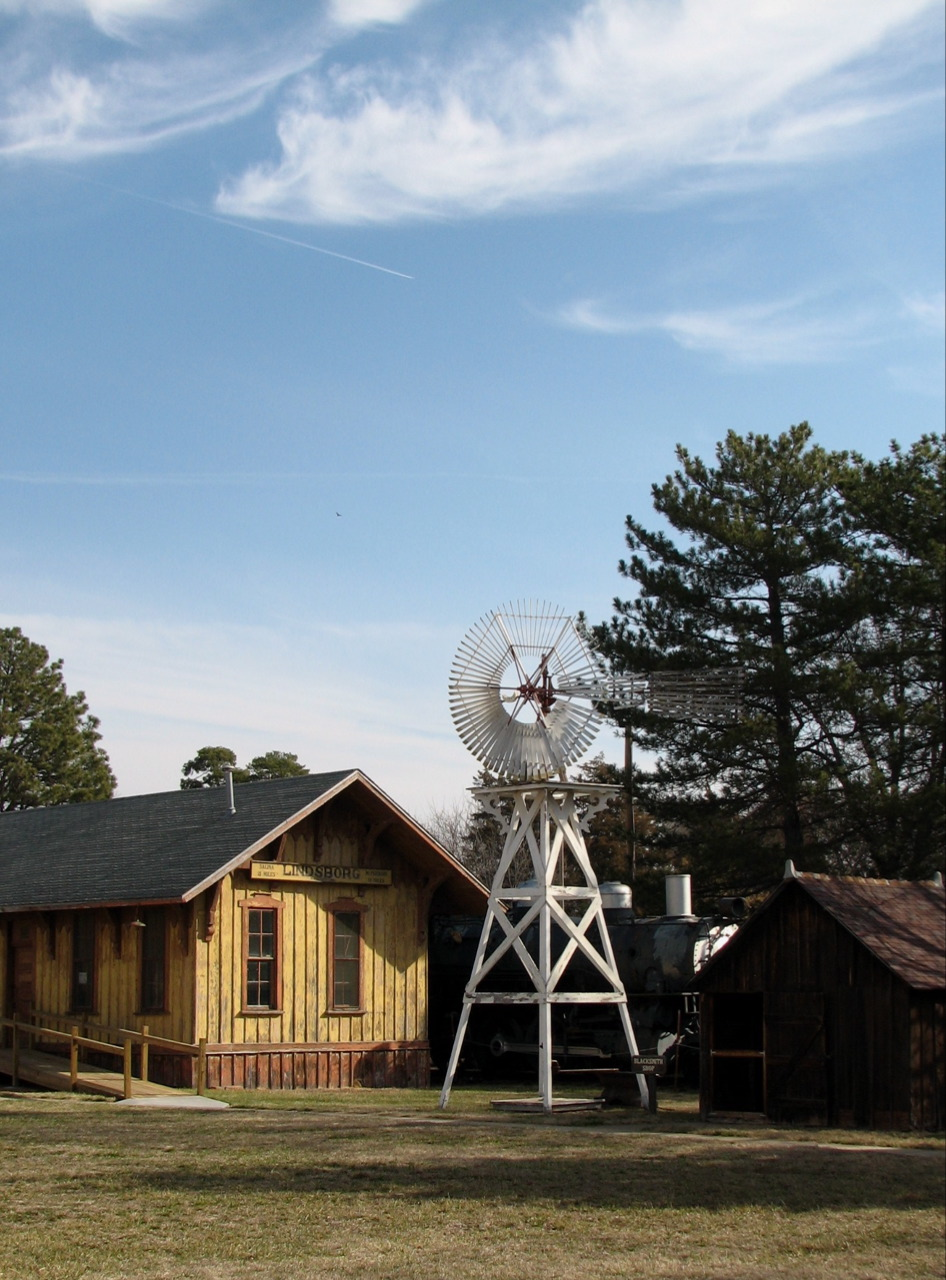
Old Lindsborg railroad station, located in Heritage Square in Lindsborg.

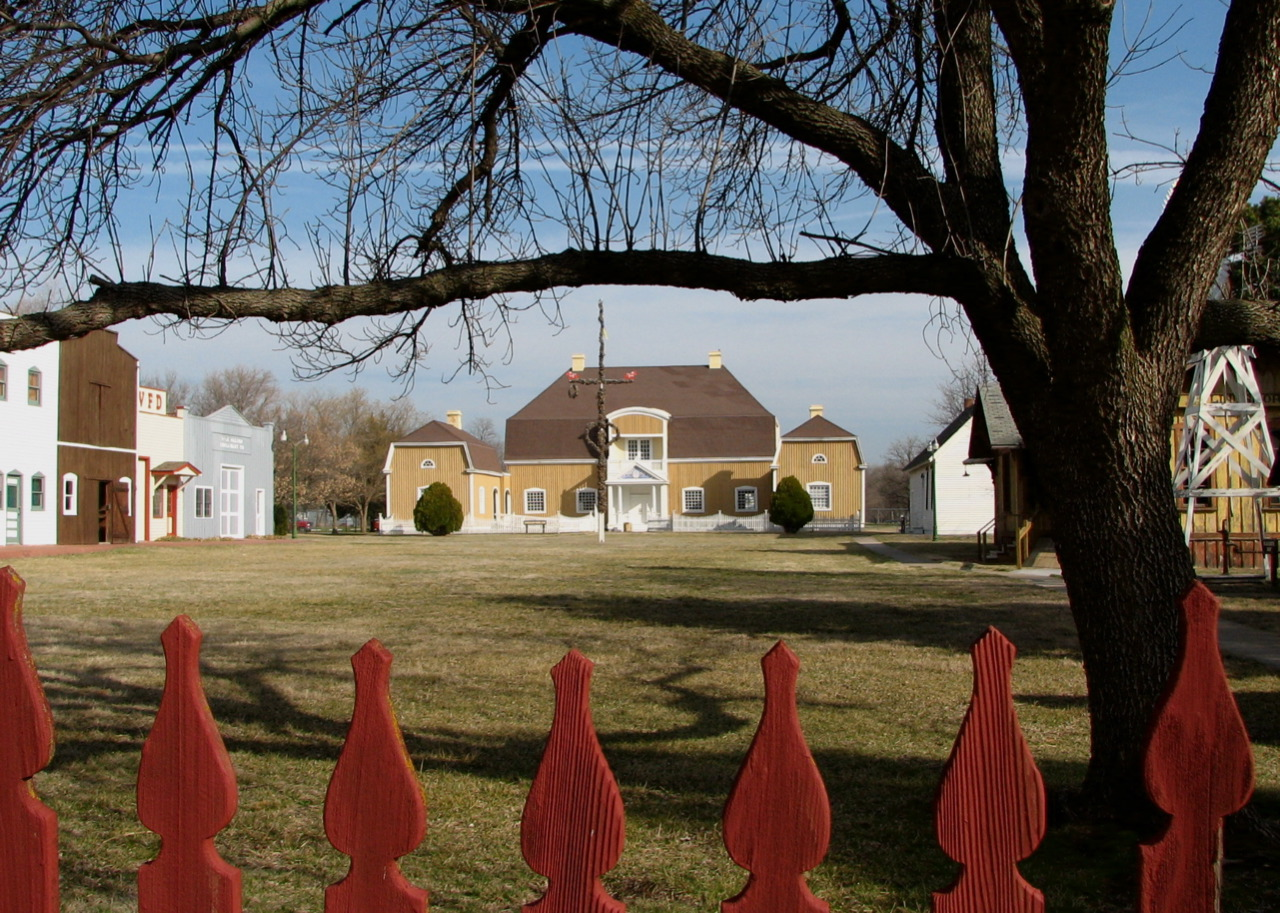
Swedish Pavilion from 1904 Saint Louis World's Fair, 2009

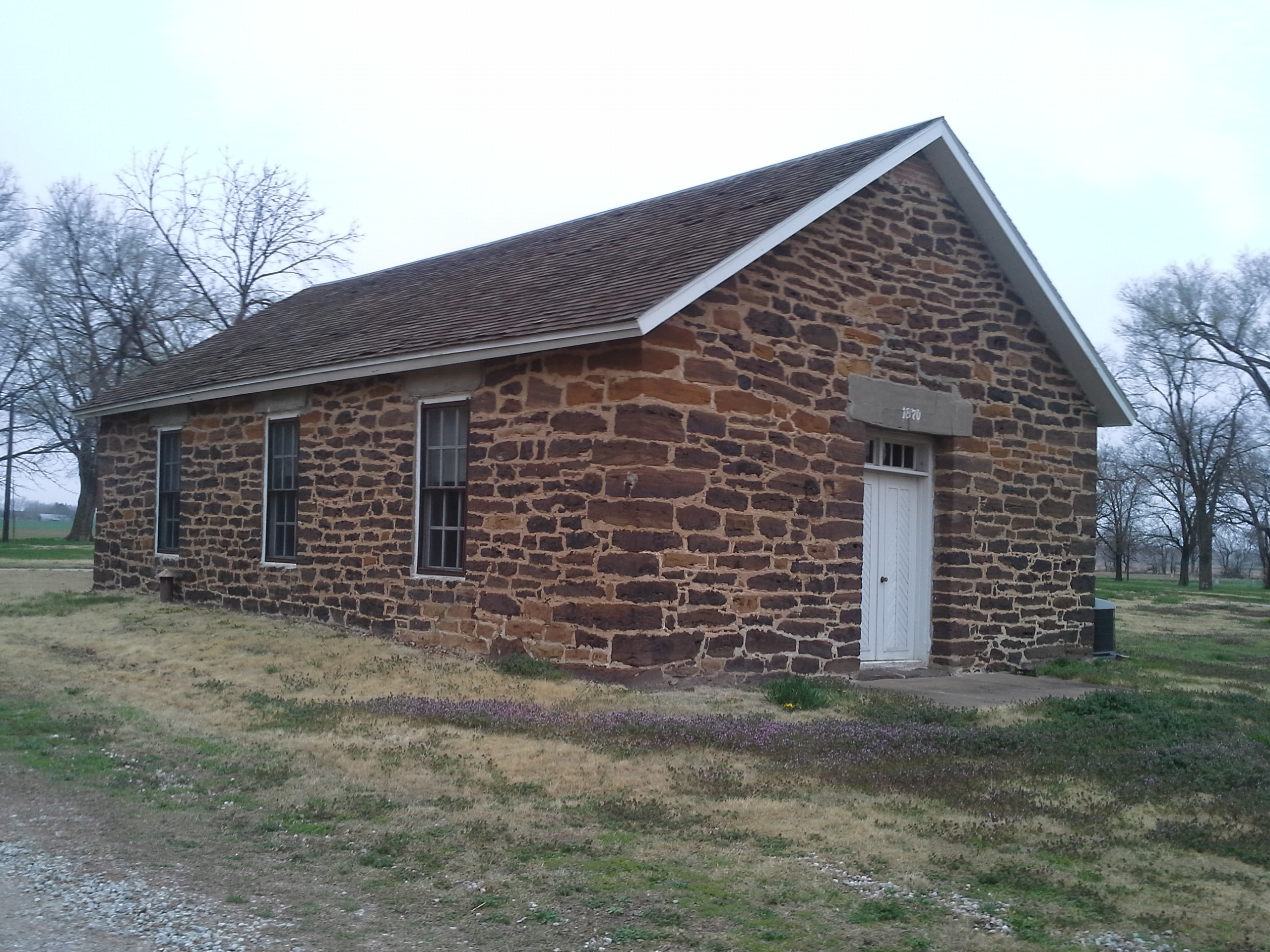
Fremont Lutheran Church (built 1870) near Lindsborg

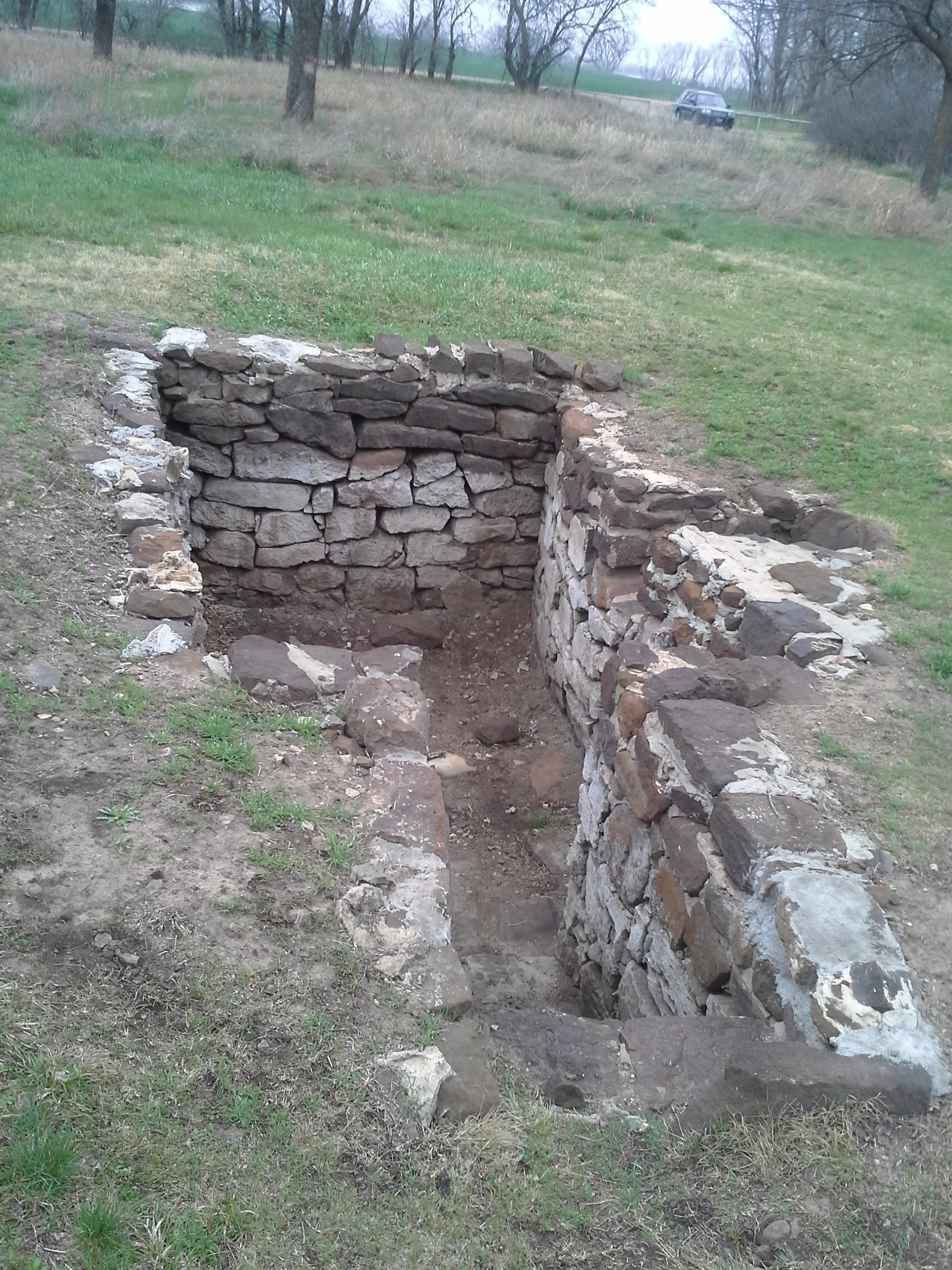
Höglund Dugout, originally the home of the Gustaf and Maria Höglund family, where they lived while constructing their larger home and homestead. 12th Avenue off Wells Fargo Road one mile from Lindsborg.

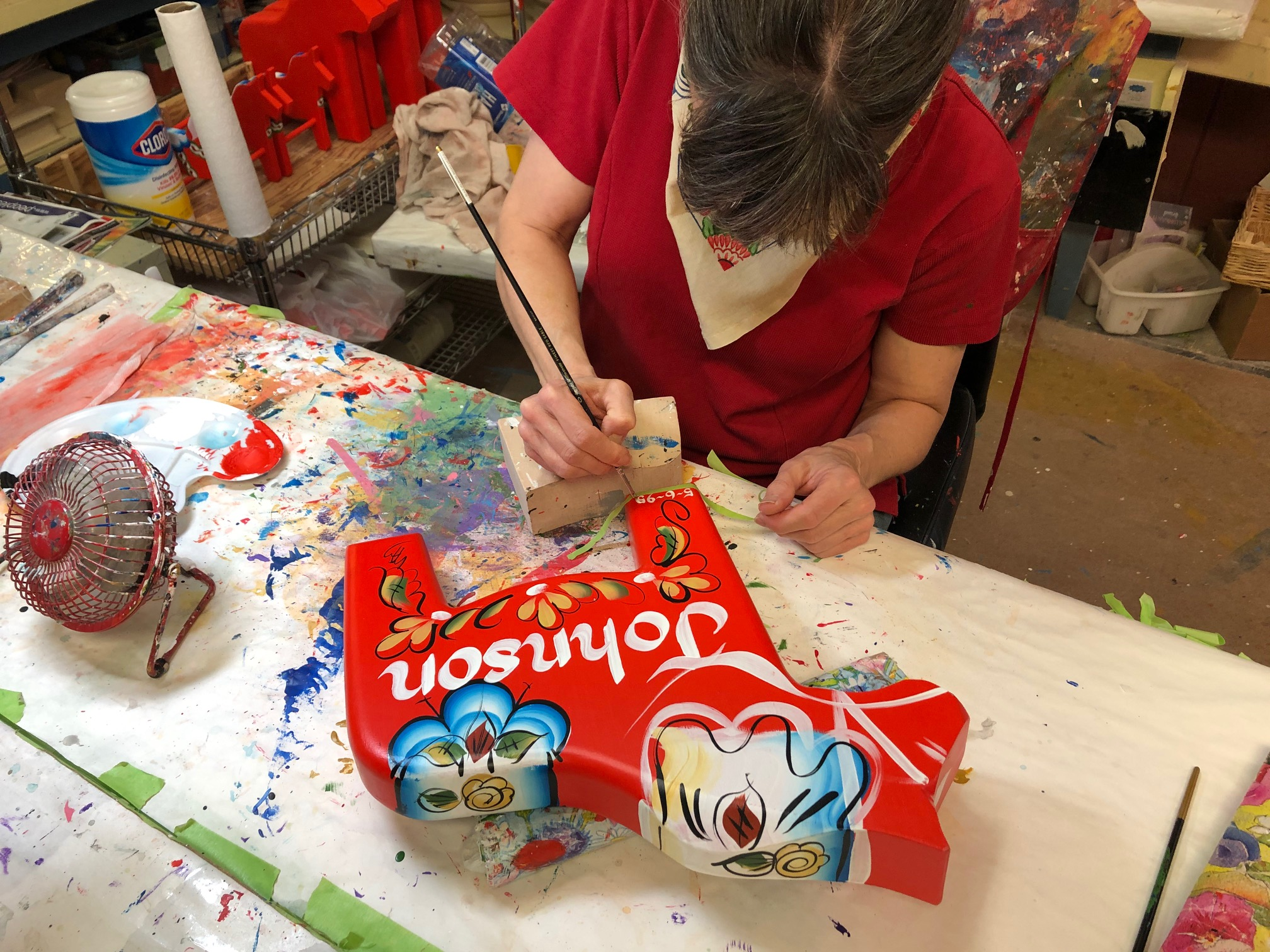
The Hemslöjd specializes in imported Swedish goods and brightly colored Dala horses that are made in-house.

== See also ==
- National Register of Historic Places listings in McPherson County, Kansas
  - Berquist & Nelson Drugstore Building (1880)
  - Clareen-Peterson Restaurant Building (1899)
  - Farmers State Bank (1887)
  - Holmberg and Johnson Blacksmith Shop (1900)
  - Johnson House (1887)
  - Smoky Valley Roller Mill (1898)
  - Swedish Pavilion (1904)
  - Teichgraeber-Runbeck House (1906)
  - Lindsborg United States Post Office (1938)
- National Register of Historic Places listings in Saline County, Kansas
  - Coronado Heights (1936)
