= List of United States natural gas companies =

This is a list of natural gas companies in the United States.

== States ==
Alabama

- Spire

Alaska

- Enstar Natural Gas
- Fairbanks Natural Gas

Arizona

- Southwest Gas Corporation
- Transwestern Pipeline

Arkansas

- CenterPoint Energy Gas Transmission
- Kinder Morgan, Inc.
- Mississippi River Transmission
- SourceGas Arkansas Inc.
- Spectra Energy, Inc.
- Summit Utilities, Inc.
- Arkansas Oklahoma Gas Corporation
- Black Hills Energy

California

- City of Long Beach Gas & Oil Department
- City of Palo Alto Gas Department
- Pacific Gas & Electric
- San Diego Gas & Electric
- Southern California Gas
- Sierra Pacific - Nevada & California, Southwest Gas Corporation
- Vernon Light & Power Department
- Clean Energy

Colorado

- Atmos Energy
- Colorado Natural Gas
- El Paso Natural Gas
- Patara Oil & Gas
- SourceGas Distribution, LLC
- Transwestern Pipeline
- Xcel Energy
- Murex Petroleum
- Black Hills Energy

Connecticut

- City of Norwich Department of Public Utilities
- Eversource Energy (via Yankee Gas)
- UIL Holdings Corp (via Connecticut Natural Gas and Southern Connecticut Gas),

Delaware

- Chesapeake Utilities
- Delmarva Power

Florida

- Florida Gas Transmission Company
- Mirabito Gas
- TECO Peoples Gas
- Florida Public Utilities
- Lake Apopka Natural Gas

Georgia

- Southern Company Gas
- Gas South
- Liberty Utilities

Hawaii

- Hawai'i Gas

Kansas

- Atmos Energy
- Kansas Gas Service
- Panhandle Eastern Pipe Line
- Xcel Energy
- Black Hills Energy

Kentucky

- Atmos Energy
- EQT Corporation
- Columbia Gas
- People's Gas

Louisiana

- Atmos Energy
- Florida Gas Transmission Company
- Gulf South Pipe Line
- Trunkline Gas Company
- Entergy

Idaho

- Avista Utilities
- Intermountain Gas Company

Illinois

- Direct Energy
- Ameren Illinois Company
- Hudson Energy
- Illinois Gas Transmission
- Nicor Gas
- Panhandle Eastern Pipe Line
- Peoples Gas
- North Shore Gas
- Integrys
- Santanna Energy Services

Indiana

- Direct Energy
- Panhandle Eastern Pipe Line
- Vectrennipsco
- Santanna Energy Services

Iowa

- MidAmerican Energy Company
- Black Hills Energy

Maine

- Unitil Corp.
- Bangor Gas
- Maine Natural Gas
- Summit Natural Gas

Maryland

- Columbia Gas of Maryland - Baltimore Gas & Electric
- Chesapeake Utilities
- Direct Energy
- Easton Utilities
- Northeast Utilities
- Sandpiper Energy
- UGI
- Washington Gas

Massachusetts

- Berkshire Gas
- Blackstone Gas Company
- Colonial Gas
- Columbia Gas of Massachusetts
- Eversource Energy
- Holyoke Gas and Electric
- Liberty Utilities
- Middleboro Municipal Gas and Electric Department
- National Grid
- Unitil Corporation
- Wakefield Municipal Gas and Light Department
- Westfield Gas and Electric Department

Michigan

- Consumers Energy
- Direct Energy
- DTE Energy
- Semco Energy
- TransCanada
- We Energies

Mississippi

- Atmos Energy

Missouri

- Missouri Gas Energy
- Summit Natural Gas
- City Utilities of Springfield
- Laclede Gas
- Spire Inc

Minnesota

- Xcel Energy
- CenterPoint Energy

Montana

- Northwestern Corporation
- MDU Resources
- Energy West Montana
- Cut Bank Gas Company

Nebraska

- Metropolitan Utilities District
- SourceGas Distribution, LLC
- Northwestern Corporation
- Black Hills Energy

Nevada

- NV Energy
- Southwest Gas

New Jersey

- Direct Energy
- Elizabethtown Gas
- New Jersey Resources
- New Jersey Natural
- Public Service Enterprise Group
- South Jersey Industries
- Public Service Electric and Gas (PSE&G)

New Hampshire

- Eversource Energy
- Unitil Corporation
- Liberty Utilities

New Mexico

- Transwestern Pipeline
- Xcel Energy
- New Mexico Gas (NMG)

New York

- Central Hudson Gas & Electric
- Corning Natural Gas
- Direct Energy
- National Fuel Gas
- National Grid USA
- Consolidated Edison
- Rochester Gas & Electric (RG&E)
- New York State Electric & Gas (NYSEG)
- St. Lawrence Gas

North Carolina

- Duke Energy
- Piedmont Natural Gas
- XOOM Energy
- Public Service of North Carolina (PSNC)
- Frontier Natural Gas,

North Dakota

- Xcel Energy
- MDU Resources

Ohio

- Direct Energy
- East Ohio Gas
- Duke Energy
- Nisource
- Columbia Gas of Ohio
- Dominion Energy
- Northeast Ohio Natural Gas
- Orwell Natural Gas
- Santanna Energy Services

Oklahoma

- Expand Energy
- Summit Utilities, Inc.
- Oklahoma Gas & Electric
- Oklahoma Natural Gas
- ONEOK
- Williams Companies
- Xcel Energy
- Arkansas Oklahoma Gas Corporation

Oregon

- Avista Utilities
- Northwest Natural Gas
- Cascade Natural Gas

New Hampshire

- Liberty Utilities

Pennsylvania

- CNX Resources
- Columbia Gas
- Direct Energy
- EQT Corporation
- National Fuel Gas
- PECO Energy Company
- Peoples Natural Gas
- Philadelphia Gas Works
- UGI
- Santanna Energy Services

Rhode Island

- Providence Gas Company (National Grid plc)
- Rhode Island Energy

South Carolina

- Piedmont Natural Gas
- SCANA Corporation
- Lancaster County Natural Gas Authority
- Patriots Energy Group
- York County Gas Authority
- Chester County Gas Authority
- Fountain Inn Natural Gas
- SCE&G
- Dominion Carolina Gas Transmission
- Fort Hill Natural Gas Authority

South Dakota

- Xcel Energy
- Northwestern Corporation
- MDU Resources

Tennessee

- Atmos Energy
- Piedmont Natural Gas

Texas

- Atmos Energy
- Texas Gas Service
- Summit Utilities, Inc.
- SiEnerg
- Oro Negro
- Lewis Energy
- CenterPoint Energy
- ConocoPhillips
- CoServ Gas
- Direct Energy
- Gulf South Pipeline
- Patara Oil & Gas
- Texas Natural Gas
- Transwestern Pipeline
- J-W Operating Company
- Xcel Energy
- Talos Energy

Utah

- Dominion Energy

Vermont

- Énergir

Virginia

- Atmos Energy
- EQT Corporation
- Washington Gas
- Virginia Natural Gas
- Columbia Gas of Virginia
- Dominion Energy
- Columbia Gas Transmission
- Appalachian Natural Gas Distribution Company
- Roanoke Gas Company
- Carroll County Natural Gas
- CNX Resources
- Richmond Gas Works

Washington

- Avista Utilities
- Puget Sound Energy
- Cascade Natural Gas
- Northwest Natural Gas - City of Ellensburg

West Virginia

- EQT Corporation
- NiSource
- Bluefield Natural Gas
- Mountaineer Gas Company

Wisconsin

- We Energies
- Xcel Energy
- Madison Gas & Electric

Wyoming

- SourceGas Distribution, LLC
- Dominion Energy
- MDU Resources
- Black Hills Energy

== Territories ==
District of Columbia

- Washington Gas

Puerto Rico

- EcoEléctrica

== See also ==
- Lists of public utilities
