= Gas leak =

Unintended escape of gas from a pipeline or other containment

A gas leak refers to a leak of natural gas or another gaseous product from a pipeline or other containment into any area where the gas should not be present. Gas leaks can be hazardous to health as well as the environment. Even a small leak into a building or other confined space may gradually build up an explosive or lethal gas concentration. Natural gas leaks and the escape of refrigerant gas into the atmosphere are especially harmful, because of their global warming potential and ozone depletion potential.

Leaks of gases associated with industrial operations and equipment are also generally known as fugitive emissions. Natural gas leaks from fossil fuel extraction and use are known as fugitive gas emissions. Such unintended leaks should not be confused with similar intentional types of gas release, such as:

- gas venting emissions which are controlled releases, and often practiced as a part of routine operations, or
- "emergency pressure releases" prevent equipment damage and safeguard life.

Gas leaks should also not be confused with "gas seepage" from the earth or oceans - either natural or due to human activity.

== Fire and explosion safety ==
Pure natural gas is colorless and odorless and is composed primarily of methane. Unpleasant scents in the form of traces of mercaptans are usually added, to assist in identifying leaks. This odor may be perceived as rotting eggs or a faintly unpleasant skunk smell. Persons detecting the odor must evacuate the area and abstain from using open flames or operating electrical equipment, to reduce the risk of fire and explosion.

As a result of the Pipeline Safety Improvement Act of 2002 passed in the United States, federal safety standards require companies providing natural gas to conduct safety inspections for gas leaks in homes and other buildings receiving natural gas. The gas company is required to inspect gas meters and inside gas piping from the point of entry into the building to the outlet side of the gas meter for gas leaks. This may require entry into private homes by the natural gas companies to check for hazardous conditions.

== Harm to vegetation ==
Gas leaks can damage or kill plants. In addition to leaks from natural gas pipes, methane and other gases migrating from landfill garbage disposal sites can also cause chlorosis and necrosis in grass, weeds, or trees. In some cases, leaking gas may migrate as far as 100 feet (30 m) from the source of the leak to an affected tree.

== Harm to animals ==
Methane is an asphyxiant gas which can reduce the normal oxygen concentration in breathing air. Small animals and birds are also more sensitive to toxic gas like carbon monoxide that are sometimes present with natural gas. The expression "canary in a coal mine" derives from the historical practice of using a canary as an animal sentinel to detect dangerously high concentrations of naturally occurring coal gas.

== Greenhouse gas emissions ==
Methane, the primary constituent of natural gas, is up to 120 times as potent a greenhouse gas as carbon dioxide. Thus, the release of unburned natural gas produces much stronger effects than the carbon dioxide that would have been released if the gas had been burned as intended.

In the European Union, Regulation (EU) 2024/1787 talks about requirements for oil and gas operators to carry out regular leak detection surveys and repair components emitting methane above specified thresholds. The regulation also requires the measurement, monitoring, reporting, and verification of methane emissions in the energy sector.

== Leak grades ==
In the United States, most state and federal agencies have adopted the Gas Piping and Technology Committee (GPTC) standards for grading natural gas leaks.

A Grade 1 leak is a leak that represents an existing or probable hazard to persons or property, and requires immediate repair or continuous action until the conditions are no longer hazardous. Examples of a Grade 1 leak are:

- Any leak which, in the judgment of operating personnel at the scene, is regarded as an immediate hazard.
- Escaping gas that has ignited.
- Any indication of gas which has migrated into or under a building, or into a foreign sub-structure.
- Any reading at the outside wall of a building, or where gas would likely migrate to an outside wall of a building.
- Any reading of 80% LEL, or greater, in a confined space.
- Any reading of 80% LEL, or greater in small substructures (other than gas associated sub structures) from which gas would likely migrate to the outside wall of a building.
- Any leak that can be seen, heard, or felt, and which is in a location that may endanger the general public or property.

A Grade 2 leak is a leak that is recognized as being non-hazardous at the time of detection, but justifies scheduled repair based on probable future hazard. Examples of a Grade 2 Leak are:

- Leaks Requiring Action Ahead of Ground Freezing or Other Adverse Changes in Venting Conditions. Any leak which, under frozen or other adverse soil conditions, would likely migrate to the outside wall of a building.
- Leaks requiring action within six months
- Any reading of 40% LEL, or greater, under a sidewalk in a wall-to-wall paved area that does not qualify as a Grade 1 leak.
- Any reading of 100% LEL, or greater, under a street in a wall-to-wall paved area that has significant gas migration and does not qualify as a Grade 1 leak.
- Any reading less than 80% LEL in small substructures (other than gas associated substructures) from which gas would likely migrate creating a probable future hazard.
- Any reading between 20% LEL and 80% LEL in a confined space.
- Any reading on a pipeline operating at 30 percent specified minimum yield strength (SMYS) or greater, in a class 3 or 4 location, which does not qualify as a Grade 1 leak.
- Any reading of 80% LEL, or greater, in gas associated sub-structures.
- Any leak which, in the judgment of operating personnel at the scene, is of sufficient magnitude to justify scheduled repair.

A Grade 3 leak is non-hazardous at the time of detection and can be reasonably expected to remain non-hazardous. Examples of a Grade 3 Leak are:

- Any reading of less than 80% LEL in small gas associated substructures.
- Any reading under a street in areas without wall-to-wall paving where it is unlikely the gas could migrate to the out-side wall of a building.
- Any reading of less than 20% LEL in a confined space.

== Studies ==
In 2012, Boston University professor Nathan Phillips and his students drove along all 785 miles (1,263 km) of Boston roads with a gas sensor, identifying 3300 leaks. The Conservation Law Foundation produced a map showing around 4000 leaks reported to the Massachusetts Department of Public Utilities. In July 2014, the Environmental Defense Fund released an interactive online map based on gas sensors attached to three mapping cars which already were being driven along Boston streets to update Google Earth Street View. This survey differed from the previous studies in that an estimate of leak severity was produced, rather than just leak detection. This map should help the gas utility to prioritize leak repairs, as well as raising public awareness of the problem.

In 2017, Rhode Island released an estimated 15.7 million metric tons of greenhouse gases, about a third of which comes from leaks in natural gas pipes. This figure, published in 2019, was calculated based on an assumed leakage rate of 2.7% (as that is the rate of leakage in the nearby city of Boston). The study's authors estimated that fixing the leaks would incur an annual cost of $1.6 billion to $4 billion.

In 2021, University of Geoscience(Beijing) affiliates Jian Rui Feng and Wen-men Gai, along with Chief Engineer of the Guangzhou Metro Group Co Ya-bin Yan, launched a case study modelling a subway within Guangzhou, China and potential evacuation plans and actions that could mitigate risk to personal against gas leaks via virtual computations. This study found that the activation of air vents, the reduction number of initial people that needed to evacuate, and the increased ability for each person to identity the risk all reduced the risk that a gas leak would pose within the subway.

== Regulation ==
=== Massachusetts ===
Legislation passed in 2014 requires gas suppliers to make greater efforts to control some of the 20,000 documented leaks in the US state of Massachusetts. The new law requires grade 1 and 2 leaks to be repaired if the street above a gas pipe is dug up, and requires priority be given to leaks near schools. It provides a mechanism for increased revenue from ratepayers (up to 1.5% without further approval) to cover the cost of repairs and replacement of leak-prone materials (like cast iron and non-cathodically protected steel) on an accelerated basis. The law sets a target of 20 years for replacement of pipes made from leak-prone materials if feasible given the revenue cap; as of 2015, Columbia Gas of Massachusetts (formerly named "Bay State Gas"), Berkshire Gas, Liberty Utilities, National Grid, and Unitil say they will meet this target, but NSTAR says it will take 25 years to complete. Leaks, statistics on leak-prone materials, and financial statements are reported annually to the Department of Public Utilities, which also has responsibility for rate-setting.

Additional proposals not included in the law would have required grade 3 leaks to be repaired during road construction, and priority for leaks which are killing trees or which were near hospitals or churches.

An attorney for the Conservation Law Foundation stated that the leaks were worth $38.8 million in lost natural gas, which also contributes 4% of the state's greenhouse gas emissions. A federal study prompted by US Senator Edward J. Markey concluded that Massachusetts consumers paid approximately $1.5 billion from 2000 to 2011 for gas which leaked and benefited no one. Markey has also backed legislation that would implement similar requirements at the national level, along with financing provisions for repairs.

== History ==
Catastrophic gas leaks, such as the Bhopal disaster are well-recognized as problems, but the more-subtle effects of chronic low-level leaks have been slower to gain recognition.

== Other contexts ==
In work with dangerous gases (such as in a lab or industrial setting), a gas leak may require hazmat emergency response, especially if the leaked material is flammable, explosive, corrosive, or toxic. For instance, the transportation of natural gasses can be susceptible to gas leaks them with themselves have explosive properties, such as the Latvian natural gas system and its report on the classification and potential risks of gas leakage as well as actionable responses. There is also the safety of the public to consider, such as analyzing technics to help ensure the safety and ease of evacuation plans.

== See also ==
- Gas detector
- List of pipeline accidents in the United States
- Merrimack Valley gas explosions
- 2022 Nord Stream pipeline sabotage
