= Energen Resources Corporation =

- Company type: Subsidiary of Energen Corporation
- Industry: Energy Exploration and Production
- Founded: 1998
- Headquarters: Birmingham, Alabama, United States
- Key people: James T. McManus II, Chief Executive Officer; Charles W. Porter, Jr., Chief Financial Officer; John S. Richardson, Chief Operating Officer
- Products: Oil and Natural Gas Exploration and Production
- Revenue: ▲$217 million USD (2013)
- Number of employees: 500-100 (2013)
- Parent: Diamondback Energy Inc

Energen Resources Corporation was a subsidiary of Energen, formerly an oil and gas exploration and production company with headquarters in Birmingham, Alabama. The company had approximately 775 million barrels of oil equivalent proved, probable, and possible reserves and another 2.5 billion barrels of oil-equivalent contingent resources. These all-domestic reserves and resources were located primarily in the Permian Basin in west Texas. Energen also had operations in the San Juan Basin in northern New Mexico.

== History ==
In 1999, Energen Resources Corporation completed the sale of its interest in 33 federal Gulf of Mexico blocks to Bellwether Exploration Company (Nasdaq: BELW) of Houston for $17 million.

On April 8, 2002, Energen Resources, the oil and gas acquisition and exploitation subsidiary of Energen Corporation, completed its planned acquisition of Permian Basin oil properties.

On August 2, 2004, Energen Resources closed on its previously announced purchase of San Juan Basin coalbed methane properties from a private company, for an adjusted purchase price of $263 million.

From 2009-2012, ERC invested about $1 billion in acquisitions to increase land position in the Permian Basin and accelerate oil growth.

In 2013 ERC sold its Black Warrior properties so that it could focus on developing Permian Basin properties.

in 2018 Energen was acquired by Diamondback Energy Inc.
