= Mobile Gas =

American natural gas utility

- Company type: Subsidiary of Spire Inc
- Industry: Utilities
- Founded: 1836
- Headquarters: Mobile, Alabama, United States
- Products: Natural Gas Provider
- Website: http://www.mobile-gas.com/

Mobile Gas, headquartered in Mobile, Alabama, was the largest natural gas utility in coastal Alabama that provided energy to 89,000 homes and businesses. Its operations dated back to 1836 when it began providing gas lighting for the city of Mobile. It had distribution territory in the cities of Mobile, Prichard, Saraland, Satsuma, Semmes, Bayou La Batre, Creola, Mt. Vernon, Spanish Fort, and Loxley. Within those cities, Mobile Gas operated 2,250 miles of pipeline and about 46 miles of transmission lines.

Mobile Gas was one of two operating units of Sempra U.S. Gas & Power. In 2016 Sempra sold EnergySouth Inc, the parent company of Mobile Gas, to Spire Inc. of St. Louis, Missouri. Spire Inc. bought Mobile gas in 2016 as well as Willmut Gas for $334 million. Spire Inc is a publicly traded company and is the modern iteration of The Laclede Group, one of the first companies to have made up the Dow Jones. Spire Inc. currently serves over 1.7 million people in Alabama, Mississippi, and Missouri. Spire Inc. was originally known as The Lacede Group until the name was voted to be changed to Spire Inc.. Spire is currently made up of acquisitions of Missouri Gas Energy, Alabama Gas Corporation, Energy South, Mobile Gas, and Willmut Gas.

Within Spire Inc., service territory formerly under Mobile Gas is now referred to as Spire Gulf Coast Inc. and is the earliest established gas distribution system within the company.
