= CNX =

CNX may refer to:

- IATA code of Chiang Mai International Airport, Thailand
- CNX (TV channel), a defunct television channel operating in Britain from 2002 to 2003
- CNX Resources, natural gas company formerly part of Consol Energy
- OpenStax CNX, an educational content repository based at Rice University
- Middle Cornish, ISO 639-3 language code cnx
- Vagus nerve, the tenth cranial nerve, abbreviated CN X
