= Specified minimum yield strength =

Specified Minimum Yield Strength (SMYS) means the specified minimum yield strength for steel pipe manufactured in accordance with a listed specification^{1}. This is a common term used in the oil and gas industry for steel pipe used under the jurisdiction of the United States Department of Transportation. It is an indication of the minimum stress a pipe may experience that will cause plastic (permanent) deformation.

The SMYS is required to determine the maximum allowable operating pressure (MAOP) of a pipeline, as determined by Barlow's Formula which is P = (2 * S * T)/(OD * SF), where P is pressure, OD is the pipe’s outside diameter, S is the SMYS, T is its wall thickness, and SF is a [Safety Factor].

== See also ==
- History of the petroleum industry in the United States
