= Boston explosions =

Boston explosions may refer to:

- Boston Marathon bombing, 2013
- Massachusetts gas explosions, 2018
