= Medicine Hat explosion =

1913 natural gas explosion in Alberta, Canada

- Date: Wednesday, March 19, 1913
- Time: 17:00 MT
- Location: Medicine Hat, Alberta, Canada
- Cause: Gas explosion
- Deaths: 5
- Injuries: 12

The Medicine Hat explosion occurred on the afternoon of March 19, 1913, when a pocket of gas in the basement of the former Malcolm Canneries building, in Medicine Hat, Alberta ignited and destroyed the building. The resulting explosion killed 5 people and wounded 12 others. Over 100 years later, it remains the largest industrial accident in the city’s history.

== Incident ==
In early 1913, the Malcolm Canneries building had recently been sold to the Western Canada Cold Storage and Packing company. The new owner was in the process of installing machinery used for meat packing. A watchman noticed a fire around the walls and called the local fire department. In the meantime, spectators began to gather nearby to watch the event.

When the first responders saw where the fire was coming from, they started to chop a hole in the floor of the building to locate the source. A fireman, B. Ringler, was using an axe and had just opened a hole in the floor when he felt a sudden rush of natural gas. Realizing the danger, he yelled to the other firemen to get out of the building. As the men rushed towards the exit, a mighty roar was heard as the building exploded before everyone could get out.

The explosion reportedly raised the roof of the 3-storey building in the air while the brick side walls collapsed. The roof then came crashing back down and buried two people inside. The resulting debris of bricks and timbers was launched into the surrounding area, wounding officials and spectators. In total, five people died, two of them firemen, one a city employee and two spectators including a twelve year-old boy.

== Aftermath ==
Following the explosion, crews worked to remove the debris to locate the missing. The weather in March made recovery difficult, as the temperature that night dropped to -20 degrees Celsius. The local hospital received the seriously injured as well as those with minor injuries from flying bricks.

An investigation was held and it was determined that the firemen had triggered the explosion when they used an axe to cut into a sewer pipe, where the gas was seeping from. At the time, gas leaks were common and the use of mercaptan to odorize natural gas was not yet established.

== Commemoration ==
On March 19, 2013, a public ceremony was held at Fire Station No. 3 in Medicine Hat, to commemorate the 100th anniversary of the incident. The ceremony was held at the Firefighters Memorial to recognize the loss of life and community impact due to the explosion. A private service for the families of the descendants of the fallen firefighters was also held.
