= 700 Market =

Coordinates: 38.625648°N 90.192938°W

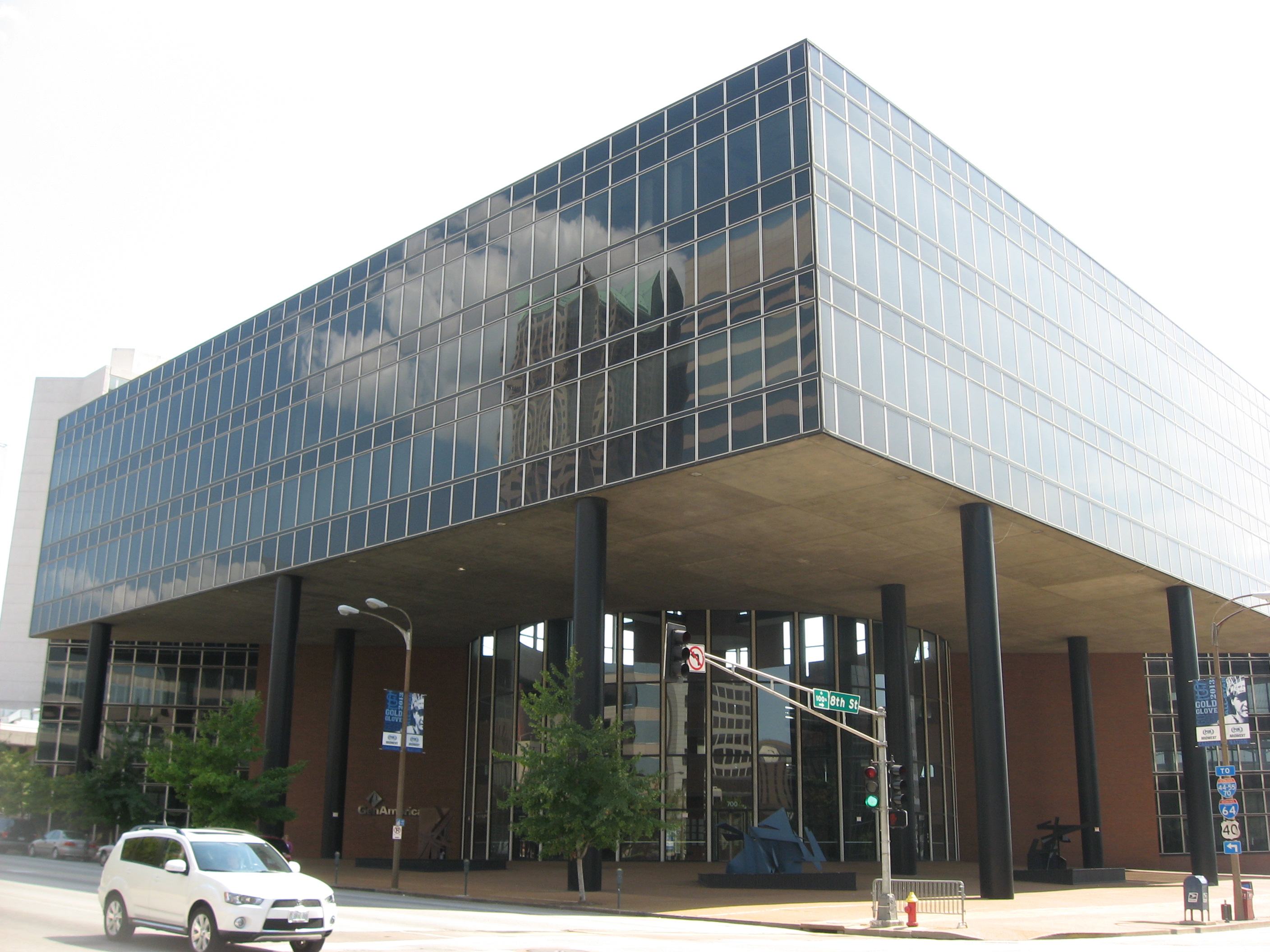
- 700 Market in 2013
- Interactive map of the 700 Market area
- Former names: GenAm Building

General information
- Status: Completed
- Location: 700 Market St. St. Louis, Missouri
- Current tenants: Spire Inc.
- Owner: The Koman Group

Technical details
- Floor count: 6
- Floor area: 127,468 sq ft

Design and construction
- Architect: Philip Johnson

Renovating team
- Architect: HOK

Other information
- Public transit: MCT; Red Blue
- General American Life Insurance Co. Buildings
- U.S. National Register of Historic Places
- NRHP reference No.: 07000461
- Added to NRHP: March 27, 2008

References
- http://www.tarltoncorp.com/Projects/Commercial/700Market.aspx http://www.hok.com/design/service/landscape-architecture/700-market-/

700 Market is a six-story office building located at 700 Market Street, in downtown St. Louis, Missouri, United States. Spire Inc. is the sole tenant of the building, using it as its corporate headquarters.

== History ==
700 Market was designed by Philip Johnson and built between 1974 and 1977. It was originally named the General American Life Insurance Company National Headquarters, located on 706 Market St., and was added to the National Register of Historic Places on March 27, 2008. It is LEED Gold Certified by the U.S. Green Building Council.

American Life moved out of the 700 Market in 2004. The building was purchased by Centaur Properties of New York in 2005 for $6.5 million. Centaur claimed to have a $10 million renovation plan in place in 2010 to help attract potential tenants, however the investment never occurred. The Koman Group bought the building in 2014, and began renovations in late April. Arcturis was responsible for its interior design, and Tarlton was responsible for demolition. In total, the renovations costed $46.4 million.

Upon completion of the redevelopment in 2015, the building was renamed 700 Market, and Spire Inc. moved into the building on a 20-year lease. They have occupied it since March 2015.

In December 2021, 700 Market was jointly sold by the Koman Group to Arch Street Capital Advisors – a New York City-based private equity firm – and Orion Properties – a Phoenix, Arizona-based firm – for $30.5 million.
