= Empire District Electric Company =

American utility company

- Company type: Subsidiary
- Industry: Electric
- Founded: 1909
- Headquarters: Joplin, Missouri
- Products: Electricity
- Parent: Liberty Utilities
- Website: www.empiredistrict.com

The Empire District Electric Company (railcar reporting mark: EDEX) is an investor-owned utility providing electric, natural gas (through its wholly owned subsidiary The Empire District Gas Company), and water service with approximately 215,000 customers in Missouri, Kansas, Oklahoma, and Arkansas. A subsidiary of the company also provides fiber optic services.

== History ==
Empire was organized in 1909, although tracing its history goes back beyond the turn of the century as the mining industry grew in the service area. As mining companies were created, electric motors began to replace the mule and steam powered engines in several of the mines.

On October 16, 1909, papers of incorporation were filed in Topeka, Kansas, bringing together several small companies to form The Empire District Electric Company, under its parent company, Cities Services.

At the time of its organization, Empire had 109 miles of transmission line, 8 megawatts of generating capacity, and 2,400 customers. Today, the Company utilizes over 1,200 miles of transmission line and over 1,300 megawatts of owned capacity to serve over 165,000 electric customers.

Empire also provides both water and natural gas service to customers in Missouri. Empire Water Company was created in 1926 and meets the needs of approximately 4,500 customers.

In 2006, Empire acquired natural gas distribution rights and created The Empire District Gas Company, a wholly owned subsidiary of The Empire District Electric Company. Empire District Gas serves over 45,000 customers.

Additionally, in an effort to help customers control their energy usage, Empire offers a variety of energy efficiency programs in each state. Programs range from rebates for upgrading to more efficient electric or natural gas equipment to free online home energy audits providing customized suggestions for customers.

In 2009, Empire celebrated a Century of Service.

The current CEO of the company, Bradley P. Beecher, earns an annual salary of $1,364,968.

In 2015, the Missouri Supreme Court ruled 5–2 against Empire District in a case in which Empire had claimed an exemption from offering solar rebates to its customers. Empire's primary concern has been its shareholders, and therefore has long resisted its customers' profit from the use of solar energy. However, the company was ordered by the court to begin paying solar rebates in May 2015, just as other state electric providers such as Ameren and Kansas City Power had already been doing for over five years.

On February 9, 2016, Empire announced its merger with Algonquin Power & Utilities Corporation of Oakville, Ontario, Canada. Empire has been purchased for $3.4 billion, and the acquisition was finalized during the first quarter of 2017. The name of the new entity is Liberty Utilities.
