= East Boston gas surge =

Fire accident

- Date: September 23, 1983; 42 years ago
- Time: 2:50 AM Eastern Daylight Time
- Duration: 2 hours 10 minutes
- Location: East Boston, Massachusetts, United States
- Type: Fires
- Cause: Failure of improperly-installed pressure regulators caused by water main break and flooding.
- Participants: Boston Gas Company
- Outcome: 9 fires started
- Deaths: 0
- Injuries: 0
- Property damage: 3 buildings destroyed, 6 damaged

Around 2:50 AM on September 23, 1983, an underground control that regulated the flow of natural gas failed, causing a surge of the fuel into the neighborhood of East Boston, Massachusetts.

The sudden swell of gas rushed into businesses and residences, increasing the size of pilot lights to as much as a foot high. A number of fires started as a result and the second floor of one building in the Central Square area exploded.

Between 3:15 am and 8:00 am, 9-1-1 operators received approximately 170 calls reporting fires and the smell of gas. People rushed into the streets, and McClellan Highway and the Callahan Tunnel were closed to incoming traffic with the exception of emergency vehicles.

By mid-morning, the fires had been extinguished and the gas problem was fixed. The Boston Gas Company later said that a broken water main had flooded a gas regulator, causing the surge. There were no reports of injuries or deaths.

== See also ==
- Merrimack Valley gas explosions
