= AltaGas =

Canadian energy infrastructure comp9

AltaGas Ltd.
- Type: Public
- Traded as: TSX: ALA
- Industry: Gas Utilities; Oil and gas
- Founded: April 1, 1994
- Headquarters: Calgary, Alberta, Canada
- Areas served: Canada; United States
- Key people: Pentti Karkkainen Chairman of the Board; Vern Yu Chief Executive Officer
- Products: Electricity generation, Natural gas
- Revenue: ▲CA$12.705 billion (2025)
- Net income: ▲CA$0.779 billion (2025)
- Total assets: ▲CA$26.770 billion (2025)
- Total equity: ▲CA$9.548 billion (2025)
- Number of employees: 2,853 (2025)
- Subsidiaries: WGL Holdings
- Website: www.altagas.ca

AltaGas is a North American energy infrastructure company based in Calgary, Alberta. It links natural gas liquids (NGLs) and natural gas to both Canadian and global markets. The company operates in four business segments: utilities, midstream, power and corporate.

== History ==
AltaGas began operations in Calgary in 1994 in the natural gas business, with the goal of building a western Canadian midstream business. The company later began its utility segment in 1998 in Alberta, and entered the power business in 2001.

In 2017, AltaGas agreed to purchase WGL Holdings, significantly expanding its presence in the United States.

== Operations ==
=== Utilities ===
AltaGas operates regulated utilities that store and deliver natural gas to end‑users across North America. The utility businesses serve approximately 1.8 million customers. The company operates as Washington Gas in the Washington metropolitan area and SEMCO Energy Gas Company in Michigan.

=== Midstream ===
The Midstream segment serves customers primarily in the Western Canadian Sedimentary Basin and transacts more than 2 billion cubic feet (57 million cubic metres) per day of natural gas. It transfers gas to its customers from wellhead to tidewater and beyond. The Midstream segment expanded its customer base in 2011 after its purchase of Pacific Northern Gas Ltd for $146.1 million. The acquisition was part of the move to capitalize on increased exploration activity in western Canada. The division serves many purposes including natural gas gathering and processing, natural gas liquids extraction and separation, transmission pipelines delivery for both gas and liquids, storage and marketing. As part of its Midstream expansion strategy, AltaGas concluded a deal with Birchcliff Energy for a long-term natural gas processing arrangement in 2018. It also entered into a joint venture with a privately held producer in the Montney shale play to construct a deep-cut natural gas processing facility.
