= Maximum allowable operating pressure =

Pressure limit

Maximum Allowable Operating Pressure (MAOP) is a pressure limit set, usually by a government body, which applies to compressed gas pressure vessels, pipelines, and storage tanks. For pipelines, this value is derived from Barlow's Formula, which takes into account wall thickness, diameter, allowable stress (which is a function of the material used), and a safety factor.

The MAOP is less than the MAWP (maximum allowable working pressure). MAWP is defined as the maximum pressure based on the design codes that the weakest component of a pressure vessel can handle. Commonly standard wall thickness components are used in fabricating pressurized equipment, and hence are able to withstand pressures above their design pressure. The MAWP is the pressure stamped on the pressure equipment, and the pressure that must not be exceeded in operation.

Design pressure is the pressure a pressurized item is designed to, and is higher than any expected operating pressures. Due to the availability of standard wall thickness materials, many components will have a MAWP higher than the required design pressure. For pressure vessels, all pressures are defined as being at highest point of the unit in the operating position, and do not include static head pressure. The equipment designer needs to account for the higher pressures occurring at some components due to static head pressure.

Relief valves are set at the design pressure of the pressurized item and sized to prevent the item under pressure from being over-pressurized. Depending on the design code that the pressurized item is designed, an over-pressure allowance can be used when sizing the relief valve. This is +10% for PD 5500, and ASME Section VIII div 1 & 2 (with an additional +10% allowance in ASME Section VIII for a fire relief case). ASME has different criteria for steam boilers.

Maximum expected operating pressure (MEOP) is the highest expected operating pressure, which is synonymous with maximum operating pressure (MOP).

== See also ==
- Massachusetts gas explosions - a series of gas-related explosions and fires caused by gas pipelines that had exceeded their MAOP
