= Alagasco =

Former natural gas company in Alabama, US

Alabama Gas Corporation
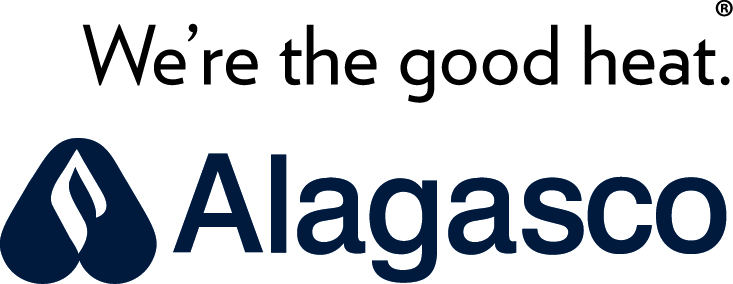
- Type: Subsidiary of Spire Inc
- Industry: Utilities
- Founded: 1948
- Fate: Acquisition; renamed Spire Alabama Inc. in 2017
- Successor: Spire Alabama Inc.
- Headquarters: Birmingham, Alabama, United States
- Key people: Ken Smith, president (2015–2017)
- Products: Natural gas
- Number of employees: 1,130 (2008)
- Website: http://www.alagasco.com/

Alabama Gas Corporation, known as Alagasco, was the largest natural gas utility in the north and central part of Alabama. It was headquartered in Birmingham and at its peak provided natural gas energy to 460,000 homes and businesses.

In 2014, Energen Corporation sold Alagasco to The Laclede Group of St. Louis. In 2017, the company was renamed Spire Alabama Inc. and rebranded as Spire.

== History ==
Alabama Gas Corporation traces its corporate history to the Montgomery Gas Light Company, which was established in 1852 to provide gas for street lighting in Montgomery, Alabama. The company was acquired by Alabama Power in 1923 and sold in 1930. It was renamed Alabama Gas Company in 1936 and acquired by Southern Natural Gas in 1937.

In 1948, Alabama Gas Company merged with Birmingham Gas Company to form Alabama Gas Corporation, which became commonly known as Alagasco. In 1953, Southern Natural Gas divested Alabama Gas Corporation, and the company became publicly traded. At that time, it had approximately 175,000 customers in Alabama. In 1974, Alabama Gas Corporation was renamed Alagasco.

In 1985, Energen Corporation became the holding company of Alabama Gas Corporation. Alagasco remained Energen's regulated natural gas utility subsidiary until 2014.

On August 31, 2014, The Laclede Group completed its acquisition of all outstanding shares of Alagasco from Energen for approximately $1.59 billion, including assumed debt. Following the transaction, Alagasco became a wholly owned subsidiary of The Laclede Group.

== Operations ==
Alagasco was the largest natural gas distributor in Alabama and served approximately 425,000 customers in more than 200 cities, towns, and communities. Its larger service areas included Birmingham, Montgomery, Anniston, Tuscaloosa, Gadsden, Opelika, and Selma. The company employed more than 1,000 people statewide.

According to its 2012 Department of Transportation reports, Alagasco operated 11,316 miles of distribution pipelines and 239 miles of transmission pipelines, all within Alabama. Its pipeline system included lines ranging from 1 to 20 inches in diameter. The company purchased and arranged transportation for approximately 80 billion cubic feet of natural gas annually and operated four liquefied natural gas (LNG) plants in the state, including two liquefaction and vaporization facilities and two vaporization-only facilities.
