= Bermuda Electric Light Company =

Bermudian electric-generating company

Bermuda Electric Light Company Limited (BELCO) is a Bermudian electricity-generating company. It is Bermuda's sole supplier of electricity, operating a generating plant, transmission and distribution systems throughout the territory. It is a subsidiary of Algonquin Power & Utilities, together with Bermuda Gas, PureNEEGY Renewables, and inVenture Limited.

BELCO's two generating stations are fueled by heavy fuel oil and diesel, all of which is imported. Oil is piped directly into the central electricity generating plant via a 9-mile-long, 6-inch-wide (14 km, 15 cm) underground pipeline from the oil docks terminal. BELCO brought online a large solar installation at L.F. Wade International Airport in 2021 which, at 6 MW peak output, provides about 8.5% of the island's electricity. Solar and other renewable energy sources had not previously been widely used in Bermuda. In 2009, BELCO used approximately one million barrels (160,000 m^{3}; 35,000,000 imp gal) of fuel. The import duty on the oil is very high, and electricity rates are very high by world standards. BELCO's maximum generation capacity is 165 MW, produced by diesel engines and gas turbines. The highest peak demand was 122.8 MW, recorded in August 2010. Large commercial organizations use about 40% of electricity produced.

The standard voltage in Bermuda is 120 V and the standard frequency is 60 Hz AC. Flat, two-pronged plugs (Type A) are in use. All US and Canadian appliances work on the island, without voltage converters or adapters.

== History ==
BELCO was incorporated in 1904 as the Bermuda Electric Light, Power & Traction Company (B.E.L.P.&T.), and started to supply electricity in Bermuda on 1 May 1908. The company purchased its present site on Serpentine Road, Hamilton, in 1909 and moved its operations there.

On 5 May 2005, BELCO completed the 20-year development of the East Power Station, officially bringing the last of eight new engines online. At the same time, the company began working on a new integrated resources plan (IRP) for the next 20 years, taking into account the island's development and emerging issues, including renewable energy and sustainable development and energy efficiency.

On 3 June 2019, BELCO's parent company, Ascendant Group, agreed to be purchased by Canadian utility conglomerate Algonquin Power & Utilities for approximately US$365 million. The sale was approved by shareholders on 9 August 2019, approved by regulators in October 2020, and completed on 9 November 2020.
