= Southern Union Company =

American natural gas utility corporation

- Industry: Petroleum industry
- Founded: 1929; 97 years ago
- Founder: Clint Murchison, Sr.
- Defunct: March 26, 2012; 14 years ago
- Headquarters: Houston, Texas
- Products: Pipeline transport

Southern Union Company was a natural gas utility and energy resources company based in Houston, Texas. In 2012, the company was acquired by Energy Transfer Partners.

The company owned and operated more than 20,000 miles (32,000 km) of gathering and transportation pipelines that transported natural gas from major producing areas to major markets in the Southeast, Midwest, and Great Lakes regions. It also owned a large liquefied natural gas import terminal.

Southern Union Gas Services, with approximately 5,500 miles of pipelines, was engaged in the gathering, transmission, treating, processing and re-delivery of natural gas and natural gas liquids in Texas and New Mexico.

== History ==
The company was founded in 1929 by Clint Murchison Sr. as Wink Gas Co., a pipeline and utility company.

In February 1990, Metro Mobile CTS, controlled by billionaire George Lindemann, acquired the company for $175 million.

In 1991, the Arizona operations were sold to Citizens Utilities.

The company acquired pipeline assets from Enron and a large natural gas business from the Bass family.

In 2003, the Texas utility operations were sold to ONEOK.

In 2012, the company sued the government in the case of Southern Union Co. v. United States, which was decided upon by the Supreme Court of the United States, after the company was convicted of storing hazardous liquid mercury without a permit.

In March 2012, the company was acquired by Energy Transfer Partners.

In September 2013, Missouri Gas Energy was sold to Laclede Group for $975 million.
