= Merrimack Valley gas explosions =

2018 gas pipeline leak in Massachusetts

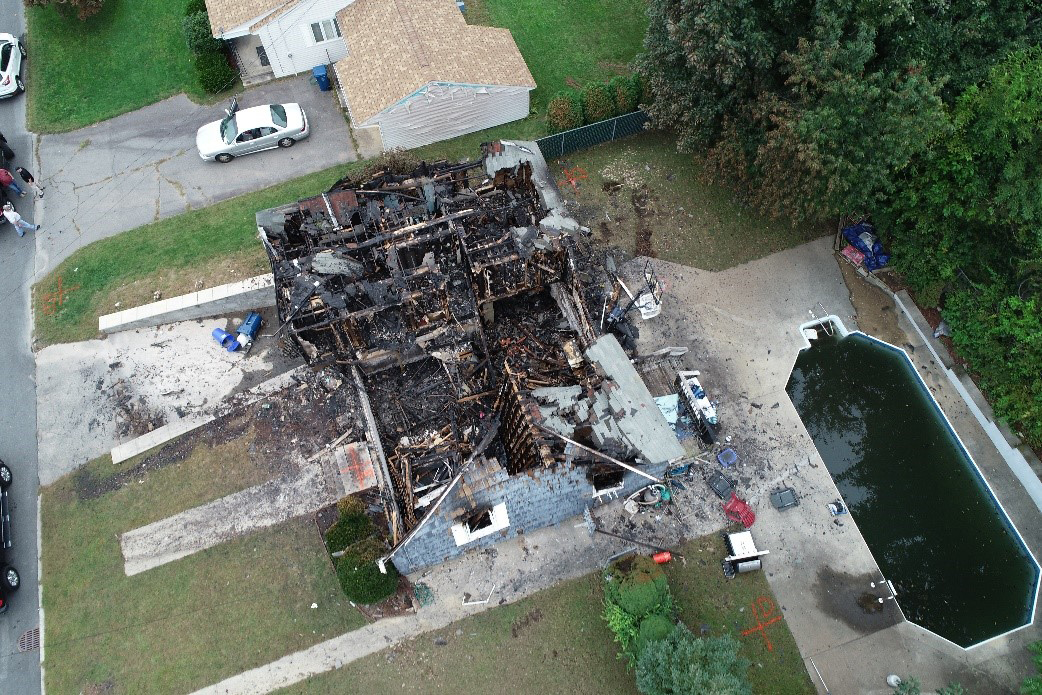
- A house damaged by a gas explosion
- Date: September 13, 2018
- Time: 4:15 pm (Eastern Daylight Time)
- Duration: 2 hours 30 minutes (estimated) (Note: The duration time reflects when the fires/explosions were first reported to the time when all of the fires were put out)
- Location: Massachusetts, United States
- Type: Fires
- Cause: Over-pressurized gas mains
- Participants: Columbia Gas Feeney Brothers
- Outcome: Cost is greater than $1 billion in property damage, personal injury, infrastructure damage and mutual aid payments to other utilities that helped in the recovery and restoration efforts.
- Deaths: 1
- Injuries: 25+
- Property damage: 60–100 homes

On September 13, 2018, excessive pressure in natural gas lines owned by Columbia Gas of Massachusetts caused a series of explosions and fires to occur in as many as 40 homes, with over 80 individual fires, in the towns of Lawrence, Andover, and North Andover, all within the Merrimack Valley, in Massachusetts, United States. One person, 18-year-old Leonel Rondon, was killed and 30,000 were forced to evacuate their homes immediately.

== Background ==
According to the NTSB's preliminary report, customers in the accident area received gas from a low-pressure (0.5 psi) distribution network which, in turn, was fed from a high-pressure (75 psi) main pipeline via regulators controlled by sensors measuring pressure in the low-pressure pipes. At the time of the accident, workers were replacing some of the low-pressure piping, but the procedure set out by Columbia Gas for doing this failed to include transfer of a regulator's pressure sensor from the old, disused piping to the new. As a result, when the old pipe was depressurized, the regulator sensed zero pressure on the low-pressure side and opened completely, feeding the main pipeline's full pressure into the local distribution network.

== Fires and explosions ==
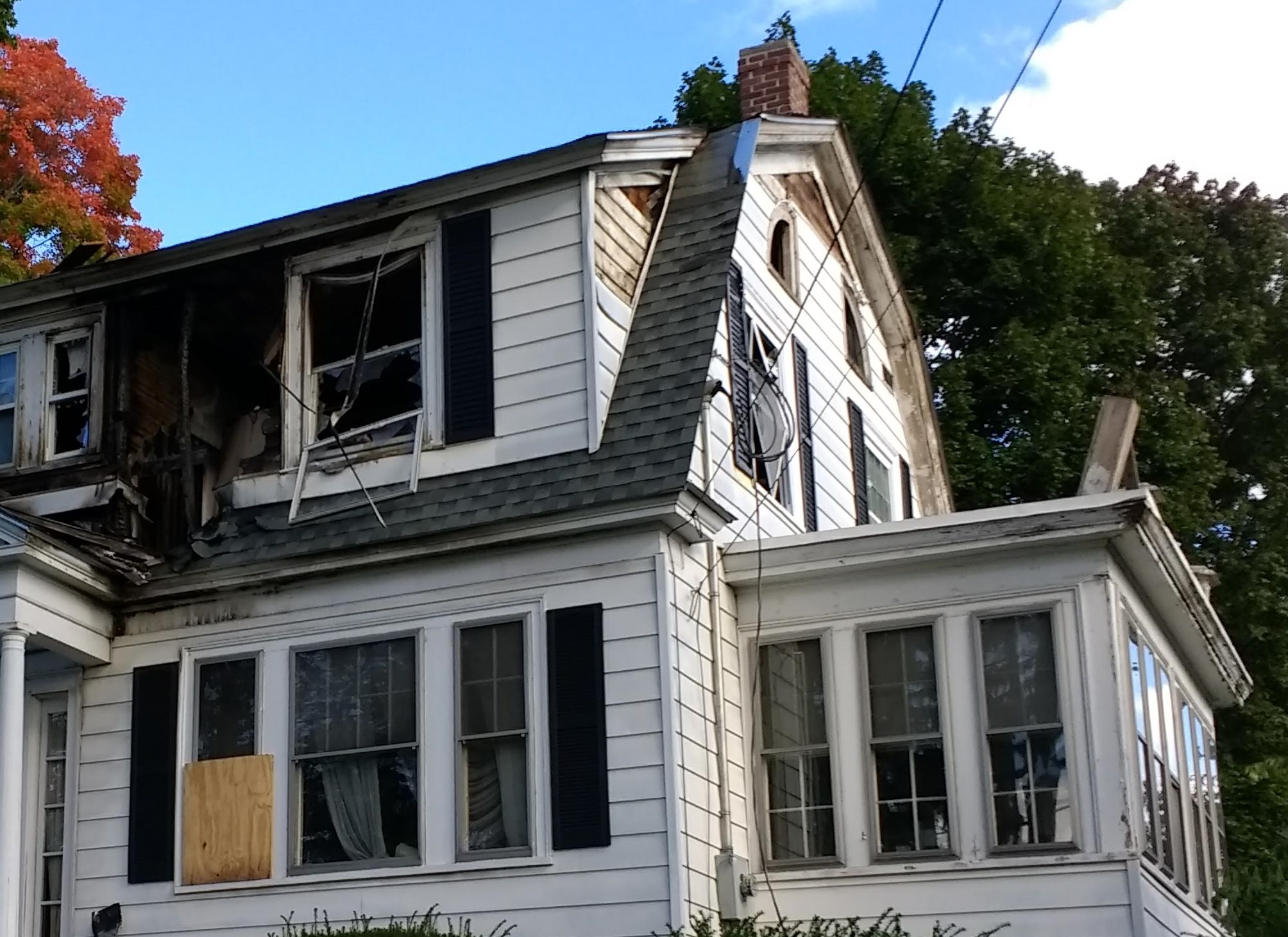
Damaged home in North Andover.

The faulty procedure used caused natural gas to build up in homes within a matter of minutes. Multiple explosions and fires were reported over a very short period of time in the towns of Lawrence, Andover, and North Andover beginning about 4:15 pm (EDT). Through the evening emergency crews responded to between 40 and 80 fires. At one time, as many as 18 fires were burning at once, and Andover officials struck a maximum 10-alarm response.

Andover's fire chief described "billows of smoke coming from Lawrence behind me, I could see plumes of smoke in front of me within the town of Andover, it just looked like an absolute war zone." A Lawrence resident described finding his boiler on fire after his smoke alarm went off; as he was extinguishing it he heard a boom from a neighbor's house and the ground shook. An explosion at one of the homes involved caused the house to shift off of its foundation. This in turn caused the chimney attached to fall on a car occupied by a fleeing resident, killing him. In addition to this death, twenty-five others were reported injured overall from the whole event. All of the fires were put out by 6:45 pm.

Once it was realized that the fires were being caused by over-pressurized gas mains, all residents in South Lawrence, and residents supplied by Columbia Gas in the area were told to evacuate their homes. Foul play was also ruled out as a possible cause by police. Gas service for approximately 8,000 residents was ultimately shut off; electricity to portions of the three communities was also interrupted to avoid igniting any lingering gas.

== Response ==
Thousands of people were told to shut off their gas service and evacuate their homes. In Lawrence, Mayor Dan Rivera urged residents in the city to move north of the Merrimack River. Schools and senior citizen centers were opened up in all three areas to take in the evacuees, and hotels offered shelter as well. The number of people evacuating by vehicle soon caused gridlock on streets that were already experiencing congestion by the afternoon rush hour commute. Portions of Interstate 93 and Interstate 495 were closed to traffic by the Massachusetts State Police and local highways such as Route 125 were temporarily converted to one-way traffic in order to accommodate fleeing residents as well as prevent others from returning to their homes. Merrimack College evacuated its buildings temporarily. Schools and state offices in the three communities remained closed the following day. First responders from as far away as Boston, Concord NH, Rochester NH, York ME, Milford NH, and New Boston NH, rushed to Lawrence, Andover, and North Andover as gas and electric lines were shut off to prevent further explosions. Additional departments further away like Laconia, Meredith, Plymouth, Peterborough and Keene were also dispatched, but were canceled en route.

The NTSB also sent a team to investigate the situation the following day stating that they were going to look at the design of the pipeline system, maintenance associated with it, the emergency response, and the integrity management system of Columbia Gas. The gas company involved released several updates about the fires and explosions through their website. The updates expressed sympathy over the "tragic incident" and the resulting death, as well as directing readers to shelters, and how to remain safe throughout the incident. Governor Baker and Lawrence mayor Dan Rivera were later heavily critical of the response issued by Columbia Gas.

On September 14, 2018, Massachusetts Governor Charlie Baker declared a state of emergency and appointed Eversource to evaluate and oversee the management of the gas distribution system in the affected area. Residents were gradually able to return to their homes and businesses, but others still remained in emergency shelters, hotels, or with friends and family. Officials entered each residence and business with the help of a locksmith if necessary, inspected for trapped gas, and ensured that the gas line from the street was turned off. Eventually lists were posted of streets that had been cleared, and electricity was gradually restored to these residents and businesses. Inspections were complete and electricity to all affected areas was restored by September 16, 2018. Some gas-dependent businesses, such as laundromats and restaurants, remained unable to open.

== Recovery ==
Restoration of gas service to the 8,600 affected customers required the replacement of about 48 miles (77 km) of gas pipeline, which Columbia Gas expected to accomplish by November 19, 2018. On September 22, 2018, National Guard troops began delivering about 7,000 hot plates to customers to temporarily replace gas stoves for cooking. There were plans to deliver about 24,000 space heaters before the cold weather arrived, with Columbia Gas paying the increased electrical bills, but no plans to make up for lack of hot showers due to disabled water heaters. The company also withdrew a $33 million rate increase which was scheduled to take effect on November 1, 2018.

In late October, the company pushed back the expected completion date to December 16. Replacement of gas mains was proceeding ahead of schedule, but some older houses were unable to accommodate newer appliances and required more work to upgrade them to current standards.

== NTSB Report ==
The National Transportation Safety Board, the government agency charged with investigating pipeline accidents, issued its final report in September 2019. The report determined that the probable cause for the event was Columbia Gas' weak engineering management which failed to plan properly for the transfer from the cast iron main to the new polyethylene main. Specifically, the cast iron main was abandoned before the relocation of regulator sensing lines was completed. Furthermore, Columbia Gas' low pressure distribution system did not include over pressure protection, thus letting high pressure gas flow unencumbered.

== Costs and legal action ==
In early May 2019, NiSource, the parent company of Columbia Gas of Massachusetts, said third-party claims related to the Merrimack Valley gas disaster could cost more than $1 billion. This amount includes property damage, personal injury, infrastructure damage and mutual aid payments to other utilities that helped in the recovery and restoration efforts. Multiple class action lawsuits were filed for negligence and destruction of property; these were eventually all settled by Columbia Gas for $143 million in July 2019. The settlement included $80 million for the affected communities, and a separate payment to the family of the deceased. In February 2020, Columbia Gas pled guilty to violating federal pipeline safety laws, and under an agreement with the Massachusetts U.S. Attorney's Office, agreed to sell its gas distribution operations in the state to Eversource Energy and pay a fine of $53 million. Columbia Gas was sentenced on June 23, 2020, and ordered to pay the $53 million fine as well as serve a three-year probation.

== See also ==
- Columbia Gas of Massachusetts
- East Boston gas surge
- 1990 Danvers gas leaks and explosions
