= WGL Holdings =

Public utility holding company

WGL Holdings, Inc.
- Type: Subsidiary
- Industry: Utilities
- Founded: 1848; 178 years ago
- Headquarters: Washington, D.C.
- Areas served: District of Columbia; Maryland; Virginia
- Key people: Donald "Blue" Jenkins (President & CEO)
- Products: Gas Utilities
- Number of employees: 1,444
- Parent: AltaGas
- Subsidiaries: Washington Gas; WGL Energy; WGL Midstream; Hampshire Gas
- Website: www.wgl.com washingtongas.com

WGL Holdings, Inc., is a public utility holding company that serves more than 1 million customers in the District of Columbia, Maryland, and Virginia. A subsidiary of AltaGas, it provides natural gas, electricity, and energy services, and also is engaged in natural gas exploration, production, and storage. The company operates four divisions: Washington Gas, WGL Energy, WGL Midstream, and Hampshire Gas.

The company dates to 1848. Today, 19th-century traces of the company include the Civil War-era aqueduct across Rock Creek Park between Georgetown and Foggy Bottom and the gas and electric street lamps installed nearby.

== History ==
Washington Gas logo

=== Company formation ===
Two petitions were sent to Congress in April 1848, and on July 8 of that year, lawmakers issued the first Congressional charter for a company that would extract gas from coal. The nation's capital had its first gas company, the Washington Gas Light Company. The company was established on the tenth street of the Foggy Bottom neighborhood, and eventually led to the area's urbanization.

=== 1850-1900 ===
George Washington Riggs became the president of the company in 1856. Two years later, the company began to build a new, more efficient factory, the West Station Works, between 26th and G Streets NW.

Meanwhile, a new plant was constructed in Foggy Bottom in 1858 at the intersection of New Hampshire and Virginia avenues NW. This location, at the head of the Chesapeake and Ohio Canal, gave it access to barges carrying coal from West Virginia and Pennsylvania.

During the American Civil War, coal and transportation grew scarce. "The cost of making gas increased one hundred and twenty-five percent, and another problem appeared when Congress reduced the gas rate seventeen percent." The company sought help from the Secretary of War and from President Abraham Lincoln, who he wrote to John W. Garrett, president of the Baltimore and Ohio Railroad, asking him to "bring coal to the city and afford the continuation of the necessary gas lighting." Production levels for gas went down during the Civil War, they soon returned to normal.

In the 1870s, several large holding tanks (gasometers) were erected at the Foggy Bottom site.

In 1891, one of the gasometers exploded; the cause was attributed to a large storm.

=== 20th century ===
The Foggy Bottom plant operated until the 1950s. In 1964, the Washington Gas Light Company sold development rights for the location in a deal that stipulated that the new structure would be supplied exclusively by the company. The site became home to the Watergate Complex, and the last building on the site was completed in 1971.

In 1997, in response to newly deregulated gas and energy markets, Washington Gas formed Washington Gas Resources Corp to serve as a holding company for non-utility subsidiaries. Also in 1997, the company created an unregulated energy company, Washington Gas Energy Services, as a subsidiary of that holding company.

=== 2000s ===
In 2014, the company rebranded itself as WGL, aiming to project the image of "a new kind of energy company: answer-oriented, technology and data driven, responsive and built for the complex energy markets of today and tomorrow". Around the same time, the company launched ProjectPIPES, which aimed to replace "all the aging, leak-prone pipeline structures with the highest risks and leak rates” that the company had installed.

On July 6, 2018, the company was acquired by AltaGas. After the deal was closed, CEO and Chairman Terry McCallister retired from WGL and COO Adrian Chapman took the position. The AltaGas/Washington Gas merger agreement approved by the DC Public Service Commission required the company to develop a plan to comply with DC's commitment of carbon neutrality. On March 16, 2020, Washington Gas released its "Climate Business Plan," which called for the continued combustion of fossil fuels while adding limited non-fossil fuel gases that also pollute the climate. In filings before the DC Public Service Commission, the DC Department of Energy and Environment and the DC Office of Attorney General said the plan is "incompatible with the District's climate policy."

In 2022, Washington Gas lobbied the DC Council to significantly weaken legislation to transition DC buildings from gas to clean energy, but the utility's effort was not successful. The Washington City paper reported that in 2024, Washington Gas hired multiple lobbyists who used deceptive tactics to seek to kill the Healthy Homes Act, legislation that would help low-income residents switch from carcinogen-leaking fossil fuel appliances to cleaner electric alternatives. Despite the gas utility's effort, the Healthy Homes Act passed the DC Council unanimously.

== Company performance ==
On January 18, 2024 a building on Marion Barry Avenue SE exploded due to a leak on a Washington Gas line. A disaster was narrowly averted as a daycare was evacuated minutes before its building was leveled. One person suffered non-fatal injuries from the flying debris. The cause of the leak was unknown but may have been caused by a car hitting a gas line.

A 2021 study by the DC Department of Energy and Environment and 2022 research by the Beyond Gas DC coalition found many of Washington Gas’s pipelines are leaking, some at potentially explosive levels. In 2024, another study found 77% of homes with gas stoves in DC had dangerous levels of nitrogen dioxide, a chemical compound linked to respiratory issues and cardiovascular diseases.
