= Energen =

Defunct company engaged in hydrocarbon exploration

Energen Corporation
- Industry: Petroleum industry
- Founded: 1979; 47 years ago
- Defunct: November 29, 2018; 7 years ago
- Fate: Acquired by Diamondback Energy
- Headquarters: Birmingham, Alabama, United States
- Key people: James T. McManus II, CEO; Charles W. Porter, Jr., CFO
- Products: Petroleum; Natural gas Natural gas liquids
- Production output: 24 thousand barrels of oil equivalent per day (1,700 MW)
- Revenue: ▼$878 million (2015)
- Operating income: ▼ -$945 million (2015)
- Net income: ▼ -$945 million (2015)
- Total assets: ▼$4.614 billion (2015)
- Total equity: ▼$2.896 billion (2015)
- Number of employees: 470 (2015)

Energen Corporation was a company engaged in hydrocarbon exploration. In 2018, the company was acquired by Diamondback Energy.

As of 31 December 2017, the company had 444 million barrels of oil equivalent (2.72×10^{9} GJ) of proved reserves, of which 58% was petroleum, 22% was natural gas, and 20% was and natural gas liquids and all of which were in the Permian Basin.

== History ==
The company, originally called Alabama Gas Corporation, was spun off from Southern Natural Gas (later, Sonat Inc.) in 1953 as part of an antitrust agreement.

In 1985, the company was renamed Energen Corporation. Its subsidiaries included its natural gas utility division, Alagasco (Alabama Gas Corporation), which was sold in 2014, and its oil and gas exploration division, Taurus Exploration (later Energen Resources).

In 2002, Energen Resources acquired properties in the Permian Basin for $120 million in cash and $70 million in stock.

In 2003, Energen Resources acquired 93 billion cubic feet of gas equivalent of proved reserves in the San Juan Basin of New Mexico and southern Colorado for $39 million.

In 2004, Energen Resources acquired San Juan Basin coalbed methane properties from a private company for $273 million.

In 2009, the company acquired assets in the Permian Basin from Range Resources for $182 million.

In 2014, the company sold its natural gas utility business, Alabama Gas Corporation (Alagasco), to Laclede Group for $1.35 billion in cash and the assumption of $250 million in debt.

In 2015, the company sold the majority of its assets in the San Juan Basin for $395 million.

In 2018, the company was acquired by Diamondback Energy.
