= J-W Energy Company =

- Company type: Private
- Industry: Petroleum industry
- Founded: November 10, 1960
- Headquarters: Dallas, Texas, United States
- Key people: H.G. Westerman (Chief Executive Officer); David Miller (President)
- Products: Natural gas
- Website: www.jwenergy.com

J-W Operating Company was founded on November 10, 1960, by Thomas Jeffrey and Howard G. Westerman.

In 1960, the principal owners of two water flood units in Arkansas, who could not agree on which of them should operate the units, offered the job to Howard Westerman. Dr. Ralph Connell loaned the money to Jeffrey and Westerman to start a new company. This marked that start of J-W as a company specializing in contract operations.

The company was contracted to drill brine wells and build a gathering system to deliver brine to a local bromine plant and dispose of the wastewater. In 1962, Thomas Jeffrey returned to independent consulting, and Howard Westerman became the sole owner and chief executive officer of J-W Operating .

Over the years, Mr. Westerman gained multiple patents and trademarks, including the "Superburn" compressor with a two-cycle stratified engine. Owning and operating pipelines and compressors allowed the company to expand operation into the oil-and-gas exploration and production business, with discoveries in Northeast Colorado and Northern Louisiana. In 1983, he created Cohort Energy Company to handle the exploration and production operations. In the late 80s, he ventured into power generation from landfill gas. In the 90s, he implemented an aggressive growth strategy and hired on professional managers whose charge was to double the size of J-W Operating Company.

In September 2010, the company was restructured and was renamed to J-W Energy Company to better reflect the company's current scope of services.

== Gas Compression - Sales, Service and Leasing ==
J-W Power Company was officially formed August 19, 1988, but was leasing compressor packages purchased from third parties as far back as October 1966 under the parent company's name of J-W Operating Company.

The majority of this early equipment was slow-speed integral compressors manufactured by Ajax. When Ariel Corporation began manufacturing high-speed separable compressors, J-W Power Company was one of the early packagers with Ariel becoming the mainstay of the current lease fleet.

In May 1976, J-W Power Company fabricated its first compressor package, an Ariel JGM/2 compressor driven by a Witte engine rated 18 BHP at 1400 RPM, in a small shop in Longview, TX. Needing a place to test his ideas for improving gas compressor packages, Mr. Westerman constructed a larger plant in January 1978 on the outskirts of Longview, TX, which is still in operation today. Since that time, J-W Power Company has taken out many patents and trademarks in gas-compressor package design. J-W Power Company packaged some of the first oil-flooded rotary screws in December 1978, and in October 1986, J-W Power patented a two-stroke stratified engine later known as the Superburn.

J-W Power Company has expanded primarily through organic growth with a few strategic acquisitions in core areas. J-W Power Company's business includes leasing, service, fabrication and sales of natural gas compression equipment.

== Compressed Natural Gas ==
J-W Power Company entered the Compressed Natural Gas (CNG) market in January 1994 when it built its first compressor package designed specifically for a Compressed Natural Gas application. Manufactured at J-W Power Company’s facility in Longview, Texas; the first CNG packages were delivered to customers in Liberal and Hugoton, Kansas, followed by Sonora, Texas and Saint John, British Columbia. The company’s experience led to being an authority in the highly engineered equipment design used in CNG applications and has built over 50,000 horsepower of CNG compression since that first CNG compressor in 1994. In addition, the company is qualified to engineering capabilities to design, manufacture, procure and install all facets of a CNG Fueling Station including the manufacturing of CNG storage spheres.
