= Laclede Gas Company =

Natural gas distribution utility in Missouri, US

Laclede Gas Company is the largest natural gas distribution utility in Missouri, serving about 632,000 residential, commercial and industrial customers in the city of St. Louis and ten counties in eastern Missouri. As an adjunct to its gas distribution business, the company operates an underground natural gas storage field, a propane storage cavern, and propane vaporization facilities.

Laclede Gas is a regulated public utility and a wholly owned subsidiary of Spire Inc. (formerly Laclede Group). Its corporate headquarters is located in the 700 Market building in downtown St. Louis.

== History ==
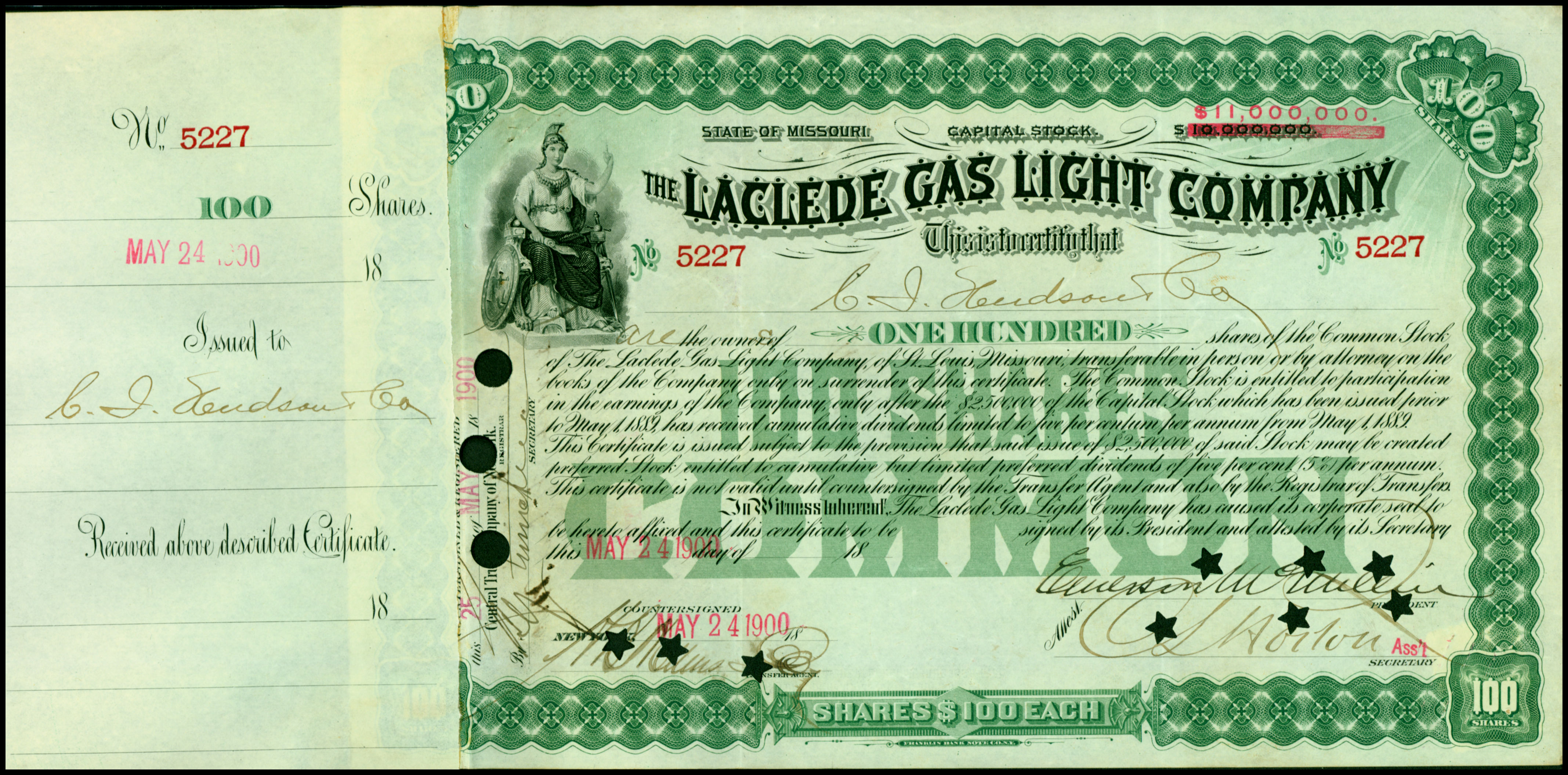
Share of the Laclede Gas Light Company, issued 24. May 1900

It was founded as the Laclede Gas Light Company, as the invention of gas lit street and home lamps was a primary, and innovative use of natural gas. In the 1800s, gas lighting began to displace candles and lamps that burned whale oil, camphine, burning fluid (a blend of turpentine and alcohol) and kerosene. It predated the invention of electric lighting and gas cooking and heating.

Laclede Gas Light Co was chartered in Missouri on March 2, 1857, named for Pierre Laclède, the founder of the city of St. Louis. In 1905, North American Company, a public utilities conglomerate, acquired St. Louis United Railways, the consolidated streetcar company in St. Louis, which operated as St. Louis Transit Company. North American reported they owned Union Electric and Laclede Gas See Streetcars in St. Louis.

In 1909, North American decided to sell Laclede Gas after lawyers advised they might be in violation of Missouri's antitrust law. American Light and Traction was under consideration as a possible buyer, but they were outbid by a consortium of St. Louis capitalists led by G. H. Walker and Adolphus Busch. They paid $7 million for the seven elevenths of outstanding shares owned by North American. Walker was a broker who planned to resell his shares. Busch's share was $1 million

== See also ==
- Erastus Wells, an early president of the company
- Spire Inc — formerly The Laclede Group Inc.

== Sources ==
- Beck, Bill (2007). Laclede Gas and St. Louis: 150 Years Working Together, 1857-2007, Laclede Gas Company. ISBN 978-0-9710910-1-6
