= Mississippi River Transmission =

The Mississippi River Transmission pipeline is a natural gas pipeline which brings natural gas from CenterPoint Energy Gas Transmission into Louisiana from Arkansas, and also into the Midwest. It is owned by CenterPoint Energy. Its FERC code is 25.
