= Algonquin Power & Utilities =

Renewable energy and utility conglomerate

Algonquin Power and Utilities Corp.
- Type: Public
- Traded as: TSX: AQN; NYSE: AQN
- Industry: Electric generation Transmission water, Natural gas and electric utilities
- Founded: 1988; 38 years ago
- Founder: Ian Robertson, Chris Jarratt
- Headquarters: Oakville, Ontario, Canada
- Area served: North America
- Key people: Rod West (CEO)
- Revenue: ▼US$2.320 billion (2024)
- Operating income: ▼US$446.1 million (2024)
- Net income: ▼US$−1.516 billion (2024)
- Total assets: ▼US$16.962 billion (2024)
- Total equity: ▼US$6.176 billion (2024)
- Number of employees: 3,786 (2025)
- Subsidiaries: Liberty Utilities (Liberty), Suralis, Bermuda Electric Light Company
- Website: algonquinpower.com

Algonquin Power & Utilities Corp. is a Canadian investor-owned regulated utility company with assets across North America, Bermuda, and Chile. Algonquin provides water, wastewater, natural gas, and electricity services through its operating subsidiaries: Liberty Utilities, its regulated utility business, and Bermuda Electric Light Company.

The company is listed under the ticker symbol "AQN" on the Toronto Stock Exchange and the American New York Stock Exchange.

== Public listing ==
Algonquin Power Income Fund was established in September 1997 and first listed its trust units on the Toronto Stock Exchange on December 23, 1997. Having raised nearly $75 M, Algonquin used $27.5 M to purchase 14 hydroelectric generation facilities located in Ontario, Québec, New York and New Hampshire.

Algonquin Power & Utilities Corp. was added to the TSX 60 Index on June 22, 2020.

== Incorporation ==
In response to the Government of Canada's decision to end the preferential tax treatment of income trusts, Algonquin Power Income Fund was converted to a corporation in October 2009. Unit-holders exchanged their trust units on a one-for-one basis for shares in the new corporate entity, Algonquin Power & Utilities.

== Liberty Utilities ==
The Liberty Utilities logo as seen in 2025

Liberty Utilities — also known as Liberty — operates regulated water, wastewater, natural gas, and electric utilities, providing local utility management, service, and support to small and mid-sized communities across the United States. Liberty also provides natural gas to customers in New Brunswick, Canada. Other operating locations are:

- Arizona (water)
  - acquired Boulders Carefree Sewer Company in Carefree in 2001.
  - acquired Gold Canyon Sewer Company in Gold Canyon in 2001
  - acquired Bella Vista Water in Sierra Vista in 2002.
  - acquired Litchfield Park Service Company in Avondale from Pinnacle West Capital in 2003
  - acquired Rio Rico Utilities in Rio Rico in 2005
  - acquired seven water companies in Whetstone and Hereford from the John McLain bankruptcy estate in 2007.
  - acquired Entrada Del Oro Sewer Company, near Gold Canyon, in 2008.
- Arkansas (water)
  - Acquired the Arkansas operations of United Water in 2012.
  - Acquired natural gas, water and electric distribution operations of Empire District Electric Company in 2017.
- California (electricity, water)
  - Acquired NV Energy's California operations, serving the Lake Tahoe Basin, with Emera in 2009; bought out Emera's stake in 2011.
  - Acquired Park Water and Apple Valley Ranchos Water, serving Southern California, in 2016 from The Carlyle Group.
  - Acquired Mesa-Crest Water Co., serving La Cañada Flintridge, in 2019.
- Georgia (gas)
  - Acquired the natural gas operation of Atmos Energy in Columbus and Gainesville in 2013
- Illinois (gas, water)
  - Acquired the water operations of Silverleaf Resorts in 2005.
  - Acquired the natural gas operations of Atmos Energy in Illinois in 2012.
- Iowa (gas)
  - Acquired the natural gas operations of Atmos Energy in Iowa in 2012.
- Kansas
  - Acquired natural gas, water and electric distribution operations of Empire District Electric Company in 2017.
- Massachusetts (gas)
  - acquired New England Gas Company in Fall River and North Attleborough from Laclede Group in 2013.
- Missouri (gas, water, electric)
  - Acquired the water operations of Silverleaf Resorts in 2005.
  - Acquired Noel Water and KMB Utilities in 2011.
  - Acquired the natural gas operations of Atmos Energy in Missouri in 2012.
  - Acquired electric, natural gas and water operations of Empire District Electric Company in 2017.
- New Hampshire (gas, electricity)
  - Acquired Granite State Electric and EnergyNorth Natural Gas from National Grid in 2012.
- New York
  - Acquired New York American Water from American Water Works in 2022.
  - Acquired St. Lawrence Gas from Enbridge in 2019.
- Oklahoma
  - Acquired electric, natural gas, and water operations of Empire District Electric Company in 2017.
- Texas (water)
  - Acquired the water operations of Silverleaf Resorts in 2005.

In January 2025, Algonquin completed the sale of its renewable assets to LS Power.

In November 2026, Algonquin completed the sale of its water operations assets in Chile (known as Suralis) to Toesca.
