= CNX Resources =

US natural gas company

CNX Resources Corporation
- Type: Public
- Traded as: NYSE: CNX; S&P 400 component
- Industry: Natural gas
- Headquarters: Canonsburg, Pennsylvania, U.S.
- Key people: Alan K. Shepard (CEO and President); Everett Good (CFO); Navneet Behl (COO)
- Products: Natural gas
- Production output: 1.505 billion cubic feet of natural gas equivalent per day (2024)
- Revenue: ▼$1.27 billion (2024)
- Net income: ▼$−90 million (2024)
- Total assets: ▼$8.51 billion (2024)
- Total equity: ▼$4.10 billion (2024)
- Number of employees: 458 (2024)
- Website: www.cnx.com

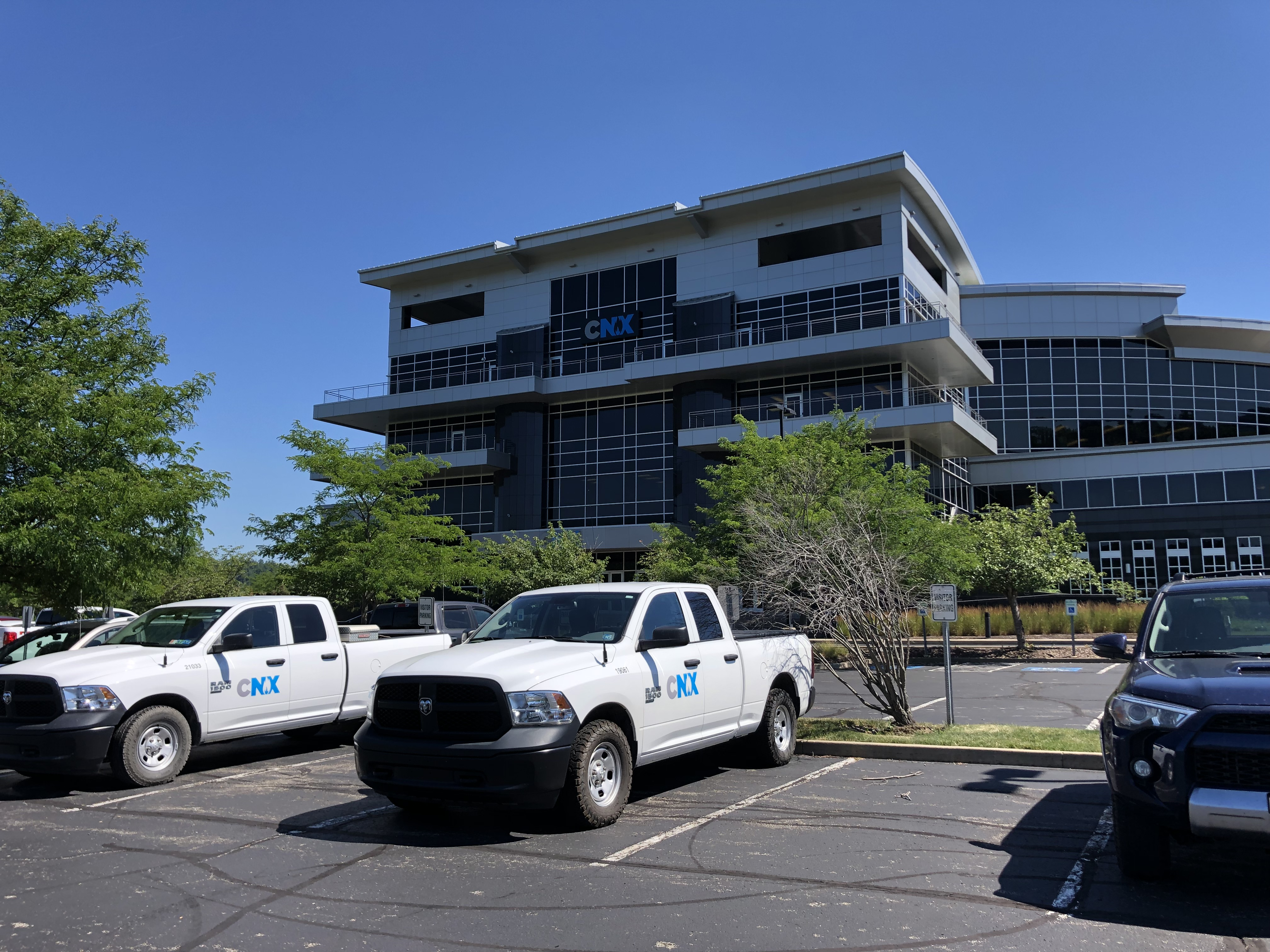
CNX Resources Headquarters

CNX Resources Corporation is an American natural gas company based in Pittsburgh with operations in the Appalachian Basin, primarily in the Marcellus Shale and Utica Shale in Pennsylvania, Ohio and West Virginia. It also develops coalbed methane properties in Virginia along with a methane capture and abatement program. The company also has extensive midstream operations and is one of the largest producers of natural gas in the United States.

== History ==
=== 1860 to 2017 ===
CNX Resources traces its roots to Consolidation Coal Company, a coal mining company founded in 1860. Dupont and Rheinbraun A.G. formed a joint venture in 1991. In May 1999, the company became a public company via an initial public offering.

In 2010, the company moved its headquarters to Cecil Township, Washington County, Pennsylvania. The company also acquired the natural gas business of Dominion Resources in 2010, which increased its drilling properties and made it one of the largest natural gas production companies in the Marcellus Shale formation.

In 2017, the company completed the corporate spin-off of Consol Energy and changed its name to CNX Resources Corporation. Nicholas (Nick) J. Deiuliis, who was the president and CEO of Consol, continued in those same roles at CNX.

=== 2018 to 2021 ===
In January 2018, the company purchased a 50% interest in CONE Gathering LLC from Noble Energy. That year CNX entered a long-term agreement with Evolution Well Services to develop a 100% electric hydraulic fracturing fleet in the Appalachian Basin. The agreement was extended in April 2022.

In 2020 CNX acquired all outstanding common shares of CNX Midstream Partners LP.

In 2021, the company created the CNX Foundation to administer its $30 million commitment to help those in the Appalachian Basin region achieve economic success. CNX also created a mentorship academy for high schoolers in disadvantaged rural and urban areas. The focus is on exposing students to career opportunities and ensuring they secure a job or apprenticeship by their high school graduation. Under the program, the students meet once a month, attend field visits with various regional employers, and have on-site visits and guest speakers. There is also coaching focused on resume creation, job interviews, civics and business, and dressing for success. The Bus Stops Here Foundation and the Builders Guild of Western Pennsylvania are original partners in the program. CNX CEO Nick Deiuliis contributed $1 million of his 2022 compensation to support the academy and proceeds from his book Precipice are also supporting the academy.

As of July 2022, the CNX Foundation had provided a $1 million grant to bring broadband to Greene County, $400,000 in career training, and $200,000 for technology needs in disadvantaged school districts with the Jerome Bettis Cyber Bus Project. In addition to the Foundation, CNX works with local communities through programs like Domestic Violence Services and Food Helpers.

=== 2022 to present ===
In May 2022, CNX partnered with the Pittsburgh International Airport (PIT) to produce alternative fuels and electricity from natural gas wells that CNX operates on airport property. PIT sits atop shale formations including the Utica and Marcellus, a natural gas reserve that runs under parts of New York, Pennsylvania, Ohio, West Virginia, Maryland, and Virginia. CNX can produce compressed natural gas (CNG) onsite to fuel land fleet transportation, and liquefied natural gas (LNG) for various purposes.

CNX started partnering with PIT in 2013 and began drilling natural gas wells in 2014. As of 2022, the partnership has supported a 5-generator, 20 MW micro-grid powered by natural gas, and a 3 MW solar array that provides 100% of the airport's electricity needs.

In May 2022, CNX announced a partnership with Pittsburgh International Airport to produce compressed natural gas and hydrogen onsite to create alternative fuel. In July, the company announced two other large deals: one with NewLight Technologies and the other with Dynamis. Under the NewLight deal, CNX committed to supply ultra-low carbon intensity methane as feedstock for the production of biomaterials for 15 years.

As for Dynamis, CNX partnered with the company to bring the first electric-powered drilling rig to the Appalachian Basin. The rig is fueled by onsite natural gas via high efficiency continuous duty natural gas reciprocating power generation, as well as battery energy storage technology.

In 2023, the CNX Foundation donated $1 million to help establish a substance recovery unit at Penn Highlands Mon Valley Hospital. The Foundation also donated $1 million for broadband access for just over 100 homes and businesses in Greene County, Pennsylvania.

In April of that year, CNX and Sapphire Technologies announced a plan to develop a FreeSpin In-line Turboexpander creating clean, or zero-emission, electricity by tapping into pressures used in producing natural gas. In November, CNX announced a collaboration with the state of Pennsylvania. CNX volunteered to be the first company to offer “radical transparency” regarding its safety measures. This includes collecting and reporting real-time data on air emissions and water quality at 9 sites (three additional pending) and two well pads, disclosing all chemical use, and expanding buffer zones.

In 2023 and again in 2024, CEO Nick Deiuliis donated an additional $1.5 million of his compensation to the academy in 2023 and again in 2024 bringing his total donation to $4 million.

In April 2024, CNX and Deep Well Services launched a new oilfield services joint venture company, AutoSep Technologies. The company will provide automated conventional flowback operations to the oil and gas industry. It is part of the CNX New Technologies unit. Another initiative under this unit is CNX’s work with NuBlu Energy to start producing lower-carbon compressed natural gas and liquefied natural gas.

In May 2024, CNX and KeyState Energy signed a letter of intent for a project that would make sustainable, hydrogen-based aviation fuel at Pittsburgh International Airport from coal-mine methane gas. The formal approval of the project depends on the approval of federal hydrogen production tax credits under the Inflation Reduction Act of 2022.

== Methane Abatement ==
The company's methane abatement program captures methane released from coal and the surrounding rock strata from mining activities. Coalbed methane is a greenhouse gas emitted from both active and closed (or abandoned) underground and surface coal mines that would be emitted to atmosphere if not for capture and abatement programs. To further reduce gas emissions, CNX was the first driller in the Appalachian Basin region to eliminate diesel engines from their hydraulic fracturing fleet and switched to all-electric.

== Awards and recognition ==
In 2020 and 2022, CNX Resources was named to Newsweek's annual "America's Most Responsible Companies" list. In 2021, the company received an ESG Top Performer award from Hart Energy.

CNX also received the Washington County Community Foundation's Charles C. Keller Excellence Award for Corporate Philanthropy.

== See also ==
- Natural gas in the United States
