= Piedmont Natural Gas =

American natural gas distribution company

Piedmont Natural Gas Co. Inc.
- Company type: Subsidiary
- Industry: Gas utilities
- Founded: 1949; 77 years ago
- Headquarters: Charlotte, North Carolina, United States
- Parent: Duke Energy
- Website: www.piedmontng.com

Piedmont Natural Gas Company, Inc. is an energy services company and wholly owned subsidiary of Duke Energy. Its principal business is the distribution of natural gas to over one million residential, commercial, industrial, and power generation customers in portions of North Carolina, South Carolina, and Tennessee. The company is also invested in businesses involved in natural gas transportation and storage.

== History ==
The company was incorporated in New York in 1950 and began operations in 1951. In 1994, it merged into a newly formed North Carolina corporation with the same name to move its business to North Carolina.

In 2013, the company was awarded as a Platinum-level Start! Fit-Friendly Company by the American Heart Association for the fifth consecutive year. The award is the highest level of recognition in AHA's Start! Program and it is bestowed to Piedmont for its high quality working environment and well-being for its staff.

The company was acquired by Duke Energy on October 3, 2016.
