= Unitil Corporation =

American interstate electricity and natural gas utility company

Unitil Corp.
- Type: Public
- Traded as: NYSE: UTL; Russell 2000 component S&P 600 component
- Industry: public utility
- Founded: 1984
- Headquarters: Hampton, New Hampshire, United States
- Area served: United States
- Services: electric utilities; natural gas
- Revenue: $366.9 Million (As of 2013)
- Website: www.unitil.com

Unitil Corporation is an interstate electricity and natural gas utility company that provides services for New Hampshire, Massachusetts and Maine. Its earliest predecessor company, the Portland Gas Light Company, was founded in Maine in 1849. The current company was set up in 1984 and is based in New Hampshire. With a market cap of 686.51M, it provides electric services to about 102,400 customers and natural gas to over 75,900 customers. The service territory of Unitil includes business districts and recreational centers as well as commercial and industrial business, such as electronic component manufacturers and education institutes. The company has an enterprise value of $766.54 million. The non-utility business is operated through the company's subsidiary, U-source, which is a national energy brokering and consulting company.

== Background ==
The company generates revenue mainly distributing utility to customers through operating the underground transmission pipeline and providing energy consulting services and real estate services. In 2013, the revenue of the gas operation is $170.4 million, accounting for 46% of the total operation revenue, and the electricity operation revenue, $190.7 million, represents 52% of the total revenue.

The company has four segments, three wholly owned distribution utilities and five subsidiaries, providing utilities and relevant advice and management service to customers. The three distribution utilities are Unitil Energy Systems, Inc., Fitchburg Gas and Electric Light Company and Northern Utilities, Inc. The cold weather caused more people to switch to Unitil's service, resulting in an increase in gas sale. As a result, the company has planned to invest $570 million to expand its distribution infrastructure to serve a larger number of customers.

In winter 2014, the company has asked for a price increase to part of its customers in Greater Portland and the Lewiston-Auburn because of the high demand and harsh weather. The Maine Public Utilities Commission (PUC) approved its price increase but cut its request by one-third. In 2018, Tom Meissner was named Unitil's Chairman of the Board, Chief Executive Officer, and President.

The Columbia Gas of Massachusetts was a supplier of retail natural gas to over 300,000 customers in parts of Massachusetts surrounding Springfield, Brockton, and Lawrence. It was a subsidiary of NiSource. The company's operations in New Hampshire and Maine were sold to Unitil Corporation in 2008. The company received attention after the Merrimack Valley gas explosions in September 2018. In February 2020, it was announced that energy company Eversource would acquire the Massachusetts gas assets of Columbia Gas for $1.1 billion. Columbia Gas was also ordered to pay a $53 million fine for violating the Pipeline Safety Act. The acquisition by Eversource was completed in October 2020, effectively ending Columbia Gas operations in Massachusetts.

On September 13, 2018, starting at approximately 4:20 PM, three Merrimack Valley communities supplied by Columbia—Lawrence, Andover, and North Andover, Massachusetts—suffered numerous fires and explosions as a result of an over-pressurized subterranean gas line. Massachusetts authorities evacuated the communities and the American Red Cross deployed and set up numerous shelters in nearby communities for those who were displaced by the explosions and subsequent fires. On September 14, Governor of Massachusetts Charlie Baker declared a state of emergency, and issued a decree appointing Eversource to evaluate and oversee the management of the gas distribution system in the affected area.

== See also ==
- NiSource
- Merrimack Valley gas explosions
