= Missouri Gas Energy =

Former natural gas distribution company located and served Missouri

Missouri Gas Energy (MGE) was a natural gas distribution company headquartered in Kansas City, Missouri in the United States, with offices in St. Joseph, Lee's Summit, Warrensburg, Joplin, Republic, Neosho and Monett. MGE served over in 155 western Missouri communities and was a division of the Southern Union Company until it was ultimately sold to the Spire Inc. Its business is regulated by the Missouri Public Service Commission.

MGE's primary business was the delivery of natural gas. The company also had programs to promote the development of compressed natural gas (CNG) vehicles throughout its service territory, and headed up the Midwest CNG Coalition, a consortium of CNG interests from Missouri, Kansas, Nebraska and Iowa.

MGE was sold by Southern Union Company to Energy Transfer Equity, and in turn, sold to Spire Inc (formerly known as The Laclede Group) on September 1, 2013.

== History ==
MGE can trace its roots back to 1867 with the formation of the Kansas City Gas Light & Coke Company. Before pipeline technology was developed to deliver natural gas from wellheads to distant cities, gas was manufactured primarily from coal in a process that produced coal gas, more commonly known as coke, for lighting, cooking and heating. In 1895, the company was reorganized and became the Kansas City Gas Company. In 1897, the company merged with its chief competitor, the Missouri Gas Company, and became the Kansas City Missouri Gas Company, though it was still commonly called by its former name.

In 1873, natural gas was discovered in southeast Kansas. Following this discovery, many small companies organized to build pipelines to deliver natural gas to nearby urban areas. In 1905, two companies introduced natural gas to the greater Kansas City area: The Wyandotte County Gas Company in Kansas City, Kansas, and the Kansas City Gas Company in Kansas City, Missouri. Both businesses were actually owned and operated by the Kansas City Gas Company, but had separate franchise agreements with each city.

Although the Kansas City Gas Company was the first business on the Missouri side to provide natural gas service to the city, it was delayed due to the multiple business interests competing for the city franchise rights. The winner of this competition was a businessman named Hugh J. McGowan, who later became president of the company. McGowan and then Kansas City, Missouri mayor Jay H. Neff didn’t agree on the details of the franchise agreement and a bitter political and legal fight ensued. The conflict was finally settled after Mayor Neff left office and a franchise agreement was awarded to the company in 1906.

Also during this time, an Ohioan named Henry L. Doherty, who had been successful in the utility business for many years, formed two companies: Henry L. Doherty & Company in 1905 and the Cities Service Company in 1910, which is now known as CITCO. Mr. Doherty used these companies to acquire many natural gas distribution and pipeline operations throughout Missouri, Kansas, Oklahoma and Nebraska. The most notable of these acquisitions was the purchase of the Kansas City Gas Company and the Wyandotte County Gas Company in 1924.

In 1925, Mr. Doherty consolidated his natural gas distribution businesses in these four states into The Gas Service Company, which was initially headquartered on the sixth floor of the Dwight Building in Kansas City, Missouri, and later in the Scarritt Building. The Gas Service Company served Kansas City and over 250 other communities throughout Missouri, Kansas, Nebraska and Oklahoma until 1983.

That year, Kansas Power and Light Company (KPL) bought The Gas Service Company. This marked the first of several successive changes in ownership. In 1992, KPL merged with the Kansas Gas & Electric company to become Western Resources (formerly known as Westar Energy). In 1994, Western Resources sold its Missouri natural gas assets to the Southern Union Company, a pipeline company headquartered in Houston. Southern Union began operating this newly formed natural gas distribution division as Missouri Gas Energy. In 2012, Southern Union, along with Missouri Gas Energy, was sold to Energy Transfer Equity, a diversified natural gas and natural gas liquids pipeline company headquartered in Dallas. In late 2012, Spire, parent company to Laclede Gas in St. Louis, Missouri, announced its intent to purchase MGE and its sister company, New England Gas, from ETE. The deal was finalized in the third quarter of 2013 and the company is now known as Spire. As part of Spire, it is now one of the largest natural gas distribution companies in the nation.

As of 2012, MGE had over 500,000 customers in 155 communities throughout western Missouri.
