= Spire Inc. =

American utility company

- Type: Public
- Traded as: NYSE: SR; S&P 400 Component
- Industry: Energy
- Founded: 1857 as The Laclede Gas Light Company
- Headquarters: St. Louis, Missouri, United States
- Area served: St. Louis, Missouri; Kansas City, Missouri; Birmingham, Alabama; Montgomery, Alabama; Mobile, Alabama; Hattiesburg, Mississippi
- Key people: Steve Lindsey (CEO)
- Products: Natural gas
- Services: Natural gas distribution
- Revenue: ▼US$1.855 billion (Fiscal Year Ended 30 September 2020)
- Operating income: ▼US$206.4 million (Fiscal Year Ended 30 September 2020)
- Net income: ▼US$88.6 million (Fiscal Year Ended 30 September 2020)
- Total assets: ▲US$8.241 billion (Fiscal Year Ended 30 September 2020)
- Total equity: ▼US$2.522 billion (Fiscal Year Ended 30 September 2020)
- Number of employees: ▲3,296 (2016)
- Subsidiaries: Alabama Gas Corporation (Alagasco); EnergySouth, Inc. Laclede Gas Company
- Website: spireenergy.com

Spire Inc. is a regional public utility holding company based in St. Louis, Missouri. It provides natural gas service as a regulated utility; it also pursues other profit-making businesses. Its primary subsidiary, Laclede Gas Company, is the largest natural gas distribution utility in Missouri, serving about 631,000 residential, commercial and industrial customers in the city of St. Louis and ten counties in eastern Missouri. Its corporate headquarters is in the 700 Market building in downtown St. Louis.

On April 29, 2016, the company began trading on the New York Stock Exchange under the symbol SR. It had previously been known as the Laclede Group, trading under the symbol LG.

== History ==
Laclede Gas Company was one of the original 12 industrial companies that made up the Dow Jones Industrial Average but was removed in 1899. On December 7, 2009, executives from The Laclede Group visited the New York Stock Exchange (NYSE) to ring the closing bell and commemorate the company's 120th anniversary of trading on the exchange. The Company first listed its stock on November 14, 1889, making it the 8th-oldest listed stock on the NYSE.

On February 1, 2012, Laclede hired its first female CEO, Suzanne Sitherwood.

In 2013, The Laclede Group acquired Missouri Gas Energy from Southern Union Company, expanding their Missouri holdings to include Kansas City.

In 2014 Laclede acquired Alabama Gas Corporation (Alagasco), which serves the Greater Birmingham, East Lauderdale County, Gadsden, Jasper, Anniston-Oxford, Greater Tuscaloosa, Greater Montgomery, Opelika-Auburn, Tuskegee, Selma, and many Black Belt communities as Spire Alabama Inc.

On April 28, 2016, The Laclede Group shareholders approved renaming the company to Spire. Later in 2016, Spire acquired Energy South, Inc from Sempra U.S. Gas & Power, the parent company of Mobile Gas and Willmut Gas. Mobile Gas operates in Mobile, Alabama as Spire Gulf Coast Inc. while Willmut gas operates in Hattiesburg, Mississippi as Spire Mississippi Inc..

== See also ==
- Laclede Gas Company - Subsidiary of the Laclede Group
- Laclede Gas Building
