= Diving rebreather =

Closed or semi-closed circuit scuba

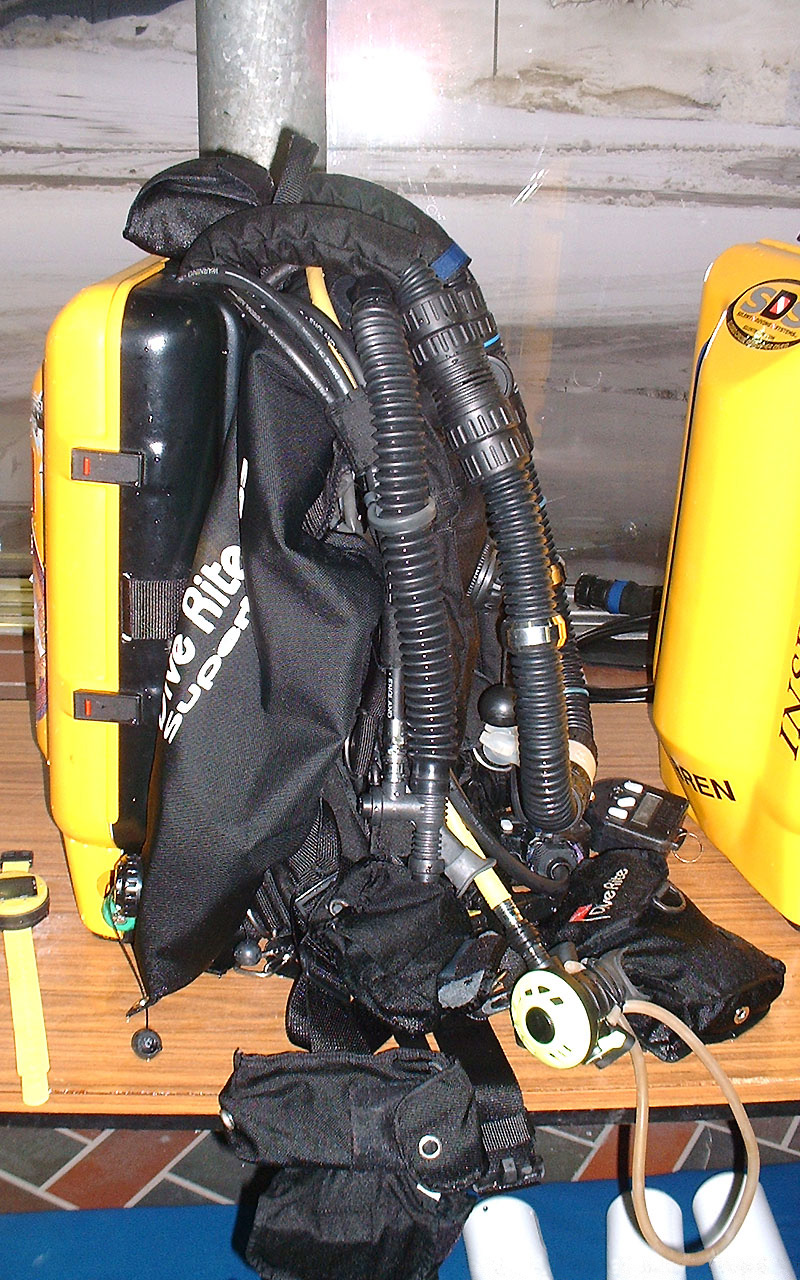
- A fully closed circuit electronic rebreather (AP Diving Inspiration)
- Acronym: CCUBA (closed circuit underwater breathing apparatus); CCR (closed circuit rebreather), SCR (semi-closed rebreather)
- Uses: Breathing set
- Related items: Rebreather

A diving rebreather is an underwater breathing apparatus that absorbs the carbon dioxide of a diver's exhaled breath to permit the rebreathing (recycling) of the substantially unused oxygen content, and unused inert content when present, of each breath. Oxygen is added to replenish the amount metabolised by the diver. This differs from open-circuit breathing apparatus, where the exhaled gas is discharged directly into the environment. The purpose is to extend the breathing endurance of a limited gas supply, and, for covert military use by frogmen or observation of underwater life, to eliminate the bubbles produced by an open circuit system.

A diving rebreather is generally understood to be a portable unit carried by the user, and is therefore a type of self-contained underwater breathing apparatus (SCUBA). A semi-closed rebreather carried by the diver may also be known as a gas extender. The same technology on a submersible, underwater habitat, or surface installation is more likely to be referred to as a life-support system.

Diving rebreather technology may be used where breathing gas supply is limited, or where the breathing gas is specially enriched or contains expensive components, such as helium diluent. Diving rebreathers have applications for primary and emergency gas supply. Similar technology is used in life-support systems in submarines, submersibles, underwater and surface saturation habitats, and in gas reclaim systems used to recover the large volumes of helium used in saturation diving. There are also use cases where the noise of open circuit systems is undesirable, such as certain wildlife photography.

The recycling of breathing gas comes at the cost of technological complexity and additional hazards, which depend on the specific application and type of rebreather used. Mass and bulk may be greater or less than equivalent open circuit scuba depending on circumstances. Electronically controlled diving rebreathers may automatically maintain a partial pressure of oxygen between programmable upper and lower limits, or set points, and be integrated with decompression computers to monitor the decompression status of the diver and record the dive profile.

== Applications ==
Diving rebreathers are generally used for scuba applications, where the amount of breathing gas carried by the diver is limited, but are also occasionally used as gas extenders for surface-supplied diving and as bailout systems for scuba or surface-supplied diving. Gas reclaim systems used for deep heliox diving use similar technology to rebreathers, as do saturation diving life support systems, but in these applications the gas recycling equipment is not carried by the diver. Atmospheric diving suits also carry rebreather technology to recycle breathing gas as part of the life-support system.

Rebreathers are usually more complex to use than open circuit scuba, and have more potential points of failure, so acceptably safe use requires a greater level of skill, attention and situational awareness, which is usually derived from understanding the systems, diligent maintenance and learning the practical skills of operation and fault recovery. Fault tolerant design can make a rebreather less likely to fail in a way that immediately endangers the user, and reduces the task loading on the diver which in turn may lower the risk of operator error.

Semi-closed rebreather technology is also used in diver carried surface supplied gas extenders, mainly to reduce helium use. Some units also function as an emergency gas supply using on-board bailout cylinders: The US Navy MK29 rebreather can extend the duration of the Flyaway Mixed Gas System diving operations by five times while retaining the original mixed-gas storage footprint on the support ship. The Soviet IDA-72 semi-closed rebreather has a scrubber endurance of 4 hours on surface supply, and bailout endurance at 200m of 40 minutes on on-board gas. The US Navy Mark V Mod 1 heliox mixed gas helmet has a scrubber canister mounted on the back of the helmet and an inlet gas injection system which recirculates the breathing gas through the scrubber to remove carbon dioxide and thereby conserve helium. The injector nozzle would blow 11 times the volume of the injected gas through the scrubber.

Semi-closed rebreathers are also used as bailout sets for saturation divers diving from closed bells, as they are capable of longer endurance than open circuit bailout sets, and are constrained by the requirement of fitting through the bell lower hatch while on the diver. The DIVEX COBRA (Compact Bailout Rebreathing Apparatus) is an emergency rebreather system intended for use as a bailout set for saturation diving to a maximum of 450 msw. It is CE certified to NORSOK U101 (Diving Respiratory Equipment) and EN14143 (Self Contained Rebreathing Apparatus). Work of breathing is claimed to be low. The semi-closed rebreather is purely mechanical in operation, has an endurance of 45 minutes using self contained gas supplied from twin cylinders mounted in the casing, and is activated by a single turn of a control valve.

== History ==
The first attempts at making practical rebreathers were simple oxygen rebreathers, when advances in industrial metalworking made high-pressure gas storage cylinders possible. From 1878 on they were used for work in unbreathable atmospheres in industry and firefighting, at high altitude, for escape from submarines; and occasionally for swimming underwater; but the usual way to work underwater was in standard diving dress, breathing open circuit surface-supplied air.

(Draeger and Mark V Helium helmet)

The Italian Decima Flottiglia MAS, the first unit of combat frogmen, was founded in 1938 and went into action in 1940. WWII saw a great expansion of military-related use of rebreather diving. During and after WWII, needs arose in the armed forces to dive deeper than allowed by pure oxygen. That prompted, at least in Britain, design of simple constant-flow "mixture rebreather" variants of some of their diving oxygen rebreathers (= what is now called "nitrox"): SCMBA from the SCBA (Swimmer Canoeist's Breathing Apparatus), and CDMBA from the Siebe Gorman CDBA, by adding an extra gas supply cylinder. Before a dive with such a set, the diver had to know the maximum or working depth of his dive, and how fast his body used his oxygen supply, and from those to calculate what to set his rebreather's gas flow rate to.

During this long period before the modern age of automatic sport nitrox rebreathers, there were some sport oxygen diving clubs, mostly in the USA.

The first rebreather with O2 sensors was invented by scientist Walter Starck in 1968. Eventually the Cold War ended and in 1989 the Communist Bloc collapsed, and as a result the perceived risk of sabotage attacks by combat divers dwindled, and Western armed forces had less reason to requisition civilian rebreather patents, and automatic and semi-automatic recreational diving rebreathers with ppO2 sensors came into widespread use.

== General concept ==
As a person breathes, the body consumes oxygen and produces carbon dioxide. Base metabolism requires about 0.25 L/min of oxygen from a breathing rate of about 6 L/min, and a fit person working hard may ventilate at a rate of 95 L/min but will only metabolise about 4 L/min of oxygen The oxygen metabolised is generally about 4% to 5% of the inspired volume at normal atmospheric pressure, or about 20% of the available oxygen in the air at sea level. Exhaled air at sea level contains roughly 13.5% to 16% oxygen.

The situation is even more wasteful of oxygen when the oxygen fraction of the breathing gas is higher, and in underwater diving, the compression of breathing gas due to depth makes the recirculation of exhaled gas even more desirable, as an even larger proportion of open circuit gas is wasted. Continued rebreathing of the same gas will deplete the oxygen to a level which will no longer support consciousness, and eventually life, so gas containing oxygen must be added to the recycled breathing gas to maintain the required concentration of oxygen.

However, if this is done without removing the carbon dioxide, it will rapidly build up in the recycled gas, resulting almost immediately in mild respiratory distress, and rapidly developing into further stages of hypercapnia, or carbon dioxide toxicity. A high ventilation rate is usually necessary to eliminate the metabolic product carbon dioxide (CO_{2}). The breathing reflex is triggered by carbon dioxide concentration in the blood, not by the oxygen concentration, so even a small buildup of carbon dioxide in the inhaled gas quickly becomes intolerable; if a person tries to directly rebreathe their exhaled breathing gas, they will soon feel an acute sense of suffocation, so rebreathers must chemically remove the carbon dioxide in a component known as a carbon dioxide scrubber.

By adding sufficient oxygen to compensate for the metabolic usage, removing the carbon dioxide, and rebreathing the gas, most of the volume is conserved. There will still be minor losses when gas must be vented as it expands during ascent, and additional gas will be needed to make up volume as the gas is compressed during descent.

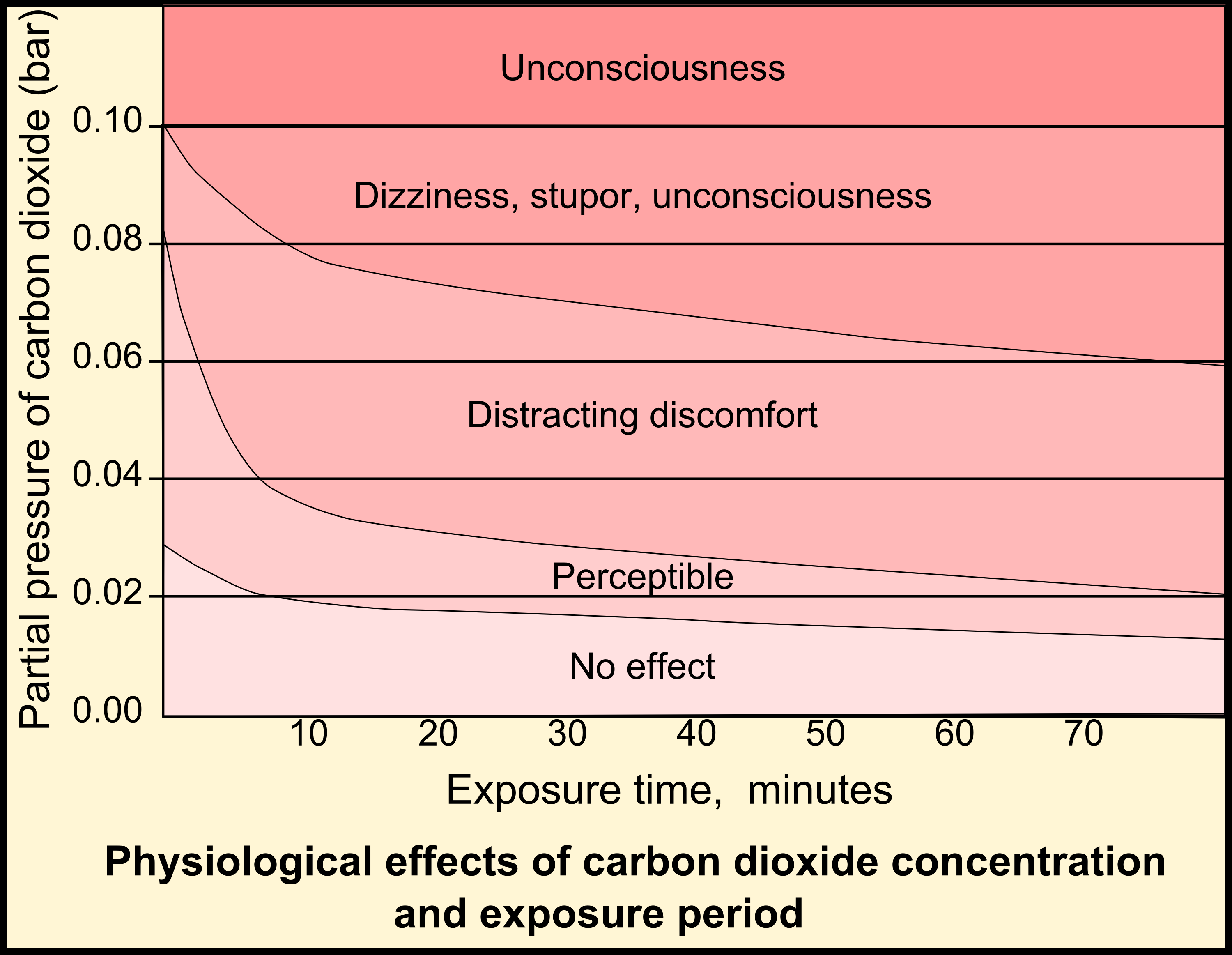
Relation of physiological effects to carbon dioxide concentration and exposure period.

Effects of different levels of oxygen partial pressure
PO_{2} (bar)	Application and effect
<0.08	Coma ultimately leading to death
0.08-0.10	Unconsciousness in most people
0.09-0.10	Serious signs/symptoms of hypoxia
0.14-0.16	Initial signs/symptoms of hypoxia (normal environment oxygen in some very high altitude areas)
0.21	Normal environment oxygen (sea level air)
0.35–0.40	Normal saturation dive PO_{2} level
0.50	Threshold for whole-body effects; maximum saturation dive exposure
1.0–1.20	Common range for recreational closed circuit set point
1.40	Recommended limit for recreational open circuit bottom sector
1.60	NOAA limit for maximum exposure for a working diver Recreational/technical limit for decompression
2.20	Commercial/military "Sur-D" chamber surface decompression on 100% O_{2} at 12 msw
2.40	40% O_{2} nitrox recompression treatment gas for use in the chamber at 50 msw (meters of sea water)
2.80	100% O_{2} recompression treatment gas for use in the chamber at 18 msw
3.00	50% O_{2} nitrox recompression treatment gas for use in the chamber at 50 msw

== Design constraints ==
The widest variety of rebreather types is used in diving, as the physical and physiological consequences of breathing under pressure complicate the requirements, and a large range of engineering options are available depending on the specific application and available budget. A diving rebreather is safety-critical life-support equipment – some modes of failure can kill the diver without warning, others can require immediate appropriate response for survival.

General operational requirements include:

- waterproof and corrosion resistant construction
- reasonably close to neutrally buoyant after ballasting
- acceptably streamlined, to minimize added swimming resistance
- low work of breathing in all diver attitudes and over the full operating depth range
- the unit should not adversely affect the diver's trim and balance
- easy and quick release of harness and unaided removal of the unit from the diver
- accessibility of control and adjustment components
- unambiguous feedback to the diver of critical information
- no critical single-point failure modes – The user should be able to deal with any single reasonably foreseeable failure without outside help

Special applications may also require:

- low noise signal
- low emission of bubbles/small bubbles
- low electromagnetic signature
- rugged construction
- light weight in air
- minimal additional task-loading for normal operation

=== Oxygen rebreathers ===
As pure oxygen is toxic when inhaled at pressure, recreational diver certification agencies limit oxygen decompression to a maximum depth of 6 metres (20 ft) and this restriction has been extended to oxygen rebreathers; In the past they have been used deeper (up to 20 metres (66 ft)) but such dives were more risky than what is now considered acceptable. Oxygen rebreathers are also sometimes used when decompressing from a deep open-circuit dive, as breathing pure oxygen helps the nitrogen diffuse out of the body tissues more rapidly, and the use of a rebreather may be more convenient for long decompression stops.

US Navy restrictions on oxygen rebreather use:

- Normal working limit 25 feet (7.6 m) for 240 minutes. (P_{O_{2}} = 1.76 bar)
- Maximum working limit 50 feet (15 m) for 10 minutes. (P_{O_{2}} = 2.5 bar)

Oxygen rebreathers are no longer commonly used in recreational diving because of the depth limit imposed by oxygen toxicity, but are extensively used for military attack swimmer applications where greater depth is not required, due to their simplicity, light weight and compact size.

=== Mixed gas rebreathers ===
Semi-closed circuit rebreathers (SCRs) used for diving may use active or passive gas addition, and the gas addition systems may be depth compensated. They use a mixed supply gas with a higher oxygen fraction than the steady state loop gas mixture. Usually only one gas mixture is used, but it is possible to switch gas mixtures during a dive to extend the available depth range of some SCRs.

Operational scope and restrictions of SCRs:

- Non-depth compensated passive addition SCRs reduce the safe range of operating depths in inverse proportion to gas endurance extension. This can be compensated by gas switching, at the expense of complexity and increased number of potential failure points.
- Constant mass flow SCRs provide a gas mixture which is not consistent over variation in diver exertion. This also limits safe operating depth range unless gas composition is monitored, also at the expense of increased complexity and additional potential failure points.
- Demand controlled active gas addition provides reliable gas mixtures throughout the potential operating depth range, and do not require oxygen monitoring, but at the cost of more mechanical complexity.
- Depth compensated passive addition provides reliable gas mixture over the potential operating depth range, which is only slightly reduced from the open circuit operational range for the gas in use at the cost of more mechanical complexity.

Closed circuit diving rebreathers may be manually or electronically controlled, and use both pure oxygen and a breathable mixed gas diluent.

Operational scope and restrictions of CCRs: Closed circuit rebreathers are mainly restricted by physiological limitations on the diver, such as maximum operating depth of the diluent mix while remaining breathable up to the surface, though this can be worked around by switching diluent. Work of breathing at depth can be a constraint, as there is a point where the breathing effort required to counter metabolic carbon dioxide production rate exceeds the work capacity of the diver, after which hypercapnia increases and distress followed by loss of consciousness and death is inevitable. Work of breathing is affected by gas density, so use of a low density helium rich diluent can increase depth range at acceptable work of breathing for a given configuration. WoB is also increased by turbulent flow, which is affected by flow velocity (Reynolds number). To some extent work of breathing can be reduced or limited by breathing circuit design, but there are physiological limits too, and the work of circulating the gas through the breathing loop and scrubber can be a large part of the total work of breathing.

=== Recreational rebreathers ===
Some recreational diver certification agencies distinguish a class of rebreather which they deem suitable for recreational diving. These rebreathers are unsuitable for decompression diving, and when electronically controlled, will not allow the diver to do dives with obligatory decompression, thereby allowing an immediate ascent at any point of the planned dive without undue risk of developing symptomatic decompression sickness. This limitation reduces the necessity to carry offboard bailout gas, and the need for the skills to bail out with a staged decompression obligation. This class of rebreather diving provides an opportunity to sell training and certification which omits a large part of the more complex and difficult skills, and reduces the amount of equipment that the diver needs to carry. PADI criteria for "R" class rebreathers include electronic prompts for pre-dive checks, automatic setpoint control, status warnings, a heads up display for warnings, a bailout valve, pre-packed scrubber canisters and a system for estimating scrubber duration. While these constraints do make the recreational class of rebreather inherently less hazardous, they do not reduce the risk to the same level as open circuit equipment for the same dive profile.

=== Atmospheric diving suits ===
An atmospheric diving suit is a small one-man articulated submersible of roughly anthropomorphic form, with limb joints which allow articulation under external pressure while maintaining an internal pressure of one atmosphere. Breathing gas supply could be surface supplied by umbilical, but would then have to be exhausted back to the surface to maintain internal pressure below the external ambient pressure, which is possible but presents pressure-hull breach hazards if the umbilical hoses are damaged, or from a rebreather system built into the suit. As there is a similar problem in venting excess gas, the simple and efficient solution is to make up oxygen as it is consumed and scrub out the carbon dioxide, with no change to the inert gas component, which simply recirculates. In effect, a simple closed circuit oxygen rebreather arrangement used as a life-support system. Since there is usually an adequate power supply for other services, powered circulation through the scrubber should not normally be an issue for normal service, and is more comfortable for the operator, as it keeps the face area clear and facilitates voice communication. As the internal pressure is maintained at one atmosphere, there is no risk of acute oxygen toxicity. Endurance depends on the scrubber capacity and oxygen supply. Circulation through the scrubber could be powered by the diver's breathing, and this is an option for an emergency backup rebreather, which may also be fitted to the suit. A breathing driven system requires reduction of mechanical dead space by using a mouthpiece and counterlung to form a closed loop.

== Architecture ==
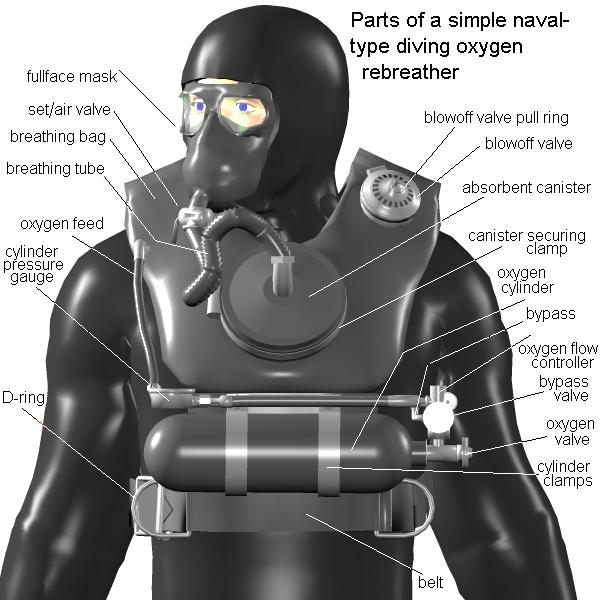
A simple naval-type diving oxygen rebreather with the parts labelled

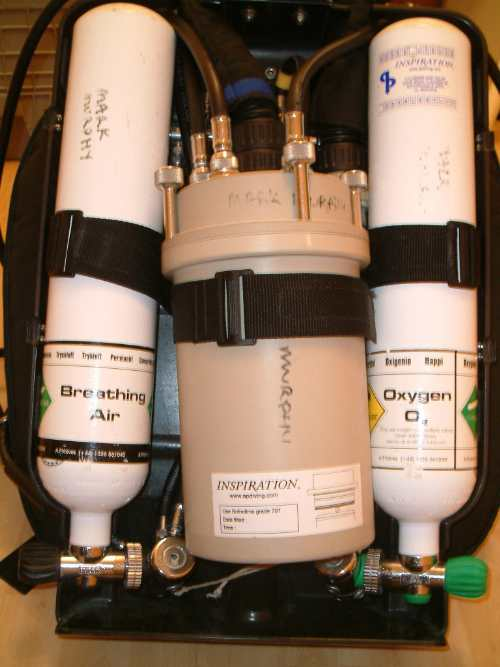
Back view of an electronically controlled closed circuit technical recreational rebreather, with the casing opened

=== Essential components ===
Although there are several design variations of diving rebreather, all types have a gas-tight reservoir to contain the breathing gas at ambient pressure that the diver inhales from and exhales into. The breathing gas reservoir consists of several components connected together by water- and airtight joints. The diver breathes through a mouthpiece or a full-face diving mask with a shut-off valve, the dive/surface valve, which is closed when the diver is not breathing from the unit to prevent flooding if the set is in the water. This is connected to one or two breathing hoses ducting inhaled and exhaled gas between the diver and a counterlung or breathing bag, which expands to accommodate gas when it is not in the diver's lungs. The reservoir also includes a scrubber containing absorbent material to remove the carbon dioxide exhaled by the diver. There will also be at least one valve allowing addition of gas, such as oxygen, and often a diluent gas, from a gas storage container, into the reservoir.

There may be valves allowing venting of gas, sensors to measure partial pressure of oxygen and possibly carbon dioxide, and a monitoring and control system. Critical components may be duplicated for engineering redundancy.

=== Breathing gas passage configuration ===
There are two basic gas passage configurations: The loop and the pendulum.

The loop configuration uses a one directional circulation of the breathing gas which on exhalation leaves the mouthpiece, passes through a non-return valve into the exhalation hose, and then through the counterlung and scrubber, to return to the mouthpiece through the inhalation hose and another non-return valve when the diver inhales.

The pendulum configuration uses a two-directional flow. Exhaled gas flows from the mouthpiece through a single hose to the scrubber, into the counterlung, and on inhalation the gas is drawn back through the scrubber and the same hose back to the mouthpiece. The pendulum system is structurally simpler, but inherently contains a larger dead space of unscrubbed gas in the combined exhalation and inhalation tube, which is rebreathed. There are conflicting requirements for minimising the volume of dead space while minimising the flow resistance of the breathing passages.

=== Counterlung configuration ===
A pendulum rebreather only has one counterlung, on the far side of the scrubber from the single breathing hose. The diver blows exhaled gas through the scrubber, then sucks it back during inhalation. Gas flow rate through the scrubber is forced by the breathing rate of the diver.

A single counterlung in a loop rebreather can be an exhalation or inhalation counterlung, or fitted between split scrubber canisters. If it is an exhalation counterlung it is inflated on exhalation, but no gas flows through the scrubber until inhalation starts, at which point the diver sucks the gas through at a rate forced by inhalation rate. If it is an inhalation counterlung, the diver must blow gas through the scrubber during exhalation, but inhales from the full inhalation counterlung, with no further flow through the scrubber. If it is between split scrubbers the diver must blow the gas through the exhalation scrubber during exhalation, and suck it through the inhalation scrubber. In all these cases there is no buffer, and peak flow rates are relatively high, which means peak flow resistance is relatively high and may be in one half of the breathing cycle or split between both halves, analogous to the pendulum configuration, but without the large dead space.

A twin counterlung rebreather has two breathing bags, so the exhaled gas inflates the exhalation counterlung while starting to pass through the scrubber and starting to inflate the inhalation counterlung. By the time the diver starts to inhale, the inhalation counterlung has built up a volume buffer, so there is less flow resistance as the gas continues to flow through the scrubber during inhalation at a slower rate than if there were only one counterlung. This decreases work of breathing, and also increases dwell time of the gas in the scrubber, as it flows through the scrubber during both exhalation and inhalation. Most mixed gas diving rebreathers use this arrangement.

=== General arrangement ===
Many rebreathers have their main components in a hard casing for support, protection and/or streamlining. This casing must be sufficiently vented and drained to let surrounding water or air in and out freely to allow for volume changes as the counterlung inflates and deflates, and to prevent trapping large volumes of buoyant air as the diver submerges, and of water as the diver emerges into air.

The components may be mounted on a frame or inside a casing to hold them together. Sometimes the structure of the scrubber canister forms part of the framework, particularly in side-mount configuration. Position of most parts is not critical to function, but the counterlungs must be positioned so that their centroid of volume is at a similar depth to the centroid of the diver's lungs at most times while underwater, and the breathing tubes to the mouthpiece should not encumber the diver more than necessary, and allow free movement of the head as much as possible.

Early oxygen rebreathers were often built without frame or casing, and relied on the harness and a strong counterlung to hold the components together.

The parts of a diving rebreather (counterlung, absorbent canister, gas cylinder(s), tubes and hoses linking them), can be arranged on the wearer's body in four basic ways, with the position of the counterlung having a major effect on work of breathing.

==== Back-mounted rebreathers ====
Back mount is common on the more bulky and heavier units. This is good for support of the weight out of the water, and keeps the front of the diver clear for working underwater. Back mount usually uses back or over the shoulder counterlungs, which have a centroid above the lung in most common orientations of the diver, resulting in slight negative pressure breathing.

==== Chest-mounted rebreathers ====
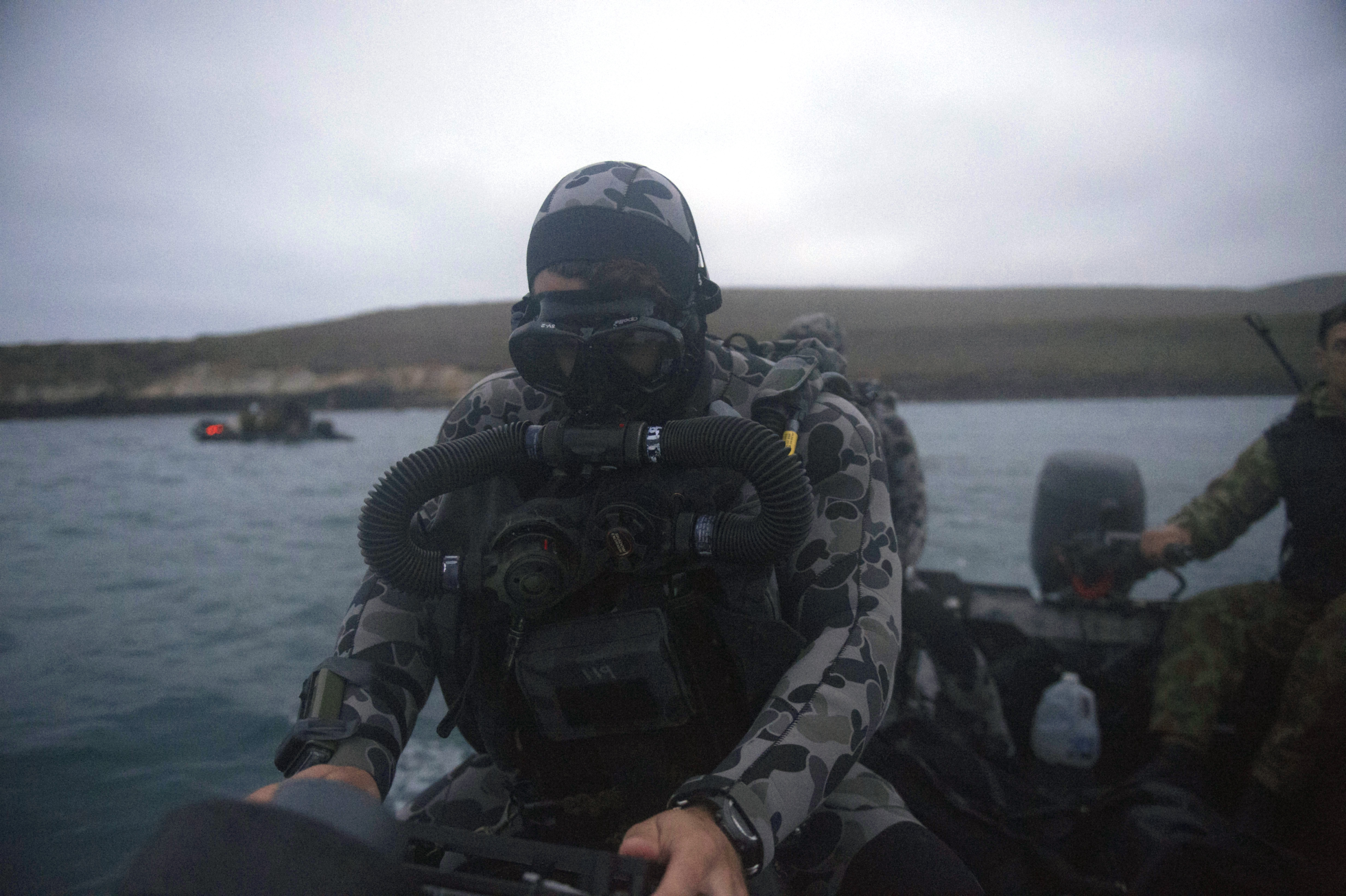
Diver with chest-mounted rebreather

Chest mount is fairly common for military oxygen rebreathers, which are usually relatively compact and light. It allows easy reach of the components underwater, and leaves the back free for other equipment for amphibious operations. The rebreather can be unclipped from a common harness without disturbing the load on the back. Front mounted counterlungs have a centroid which is generally slightly below the lung centroid, and result in slight positive pressure breathing for most common orientations of the diver.

==== Side-mounted rebreathers ====
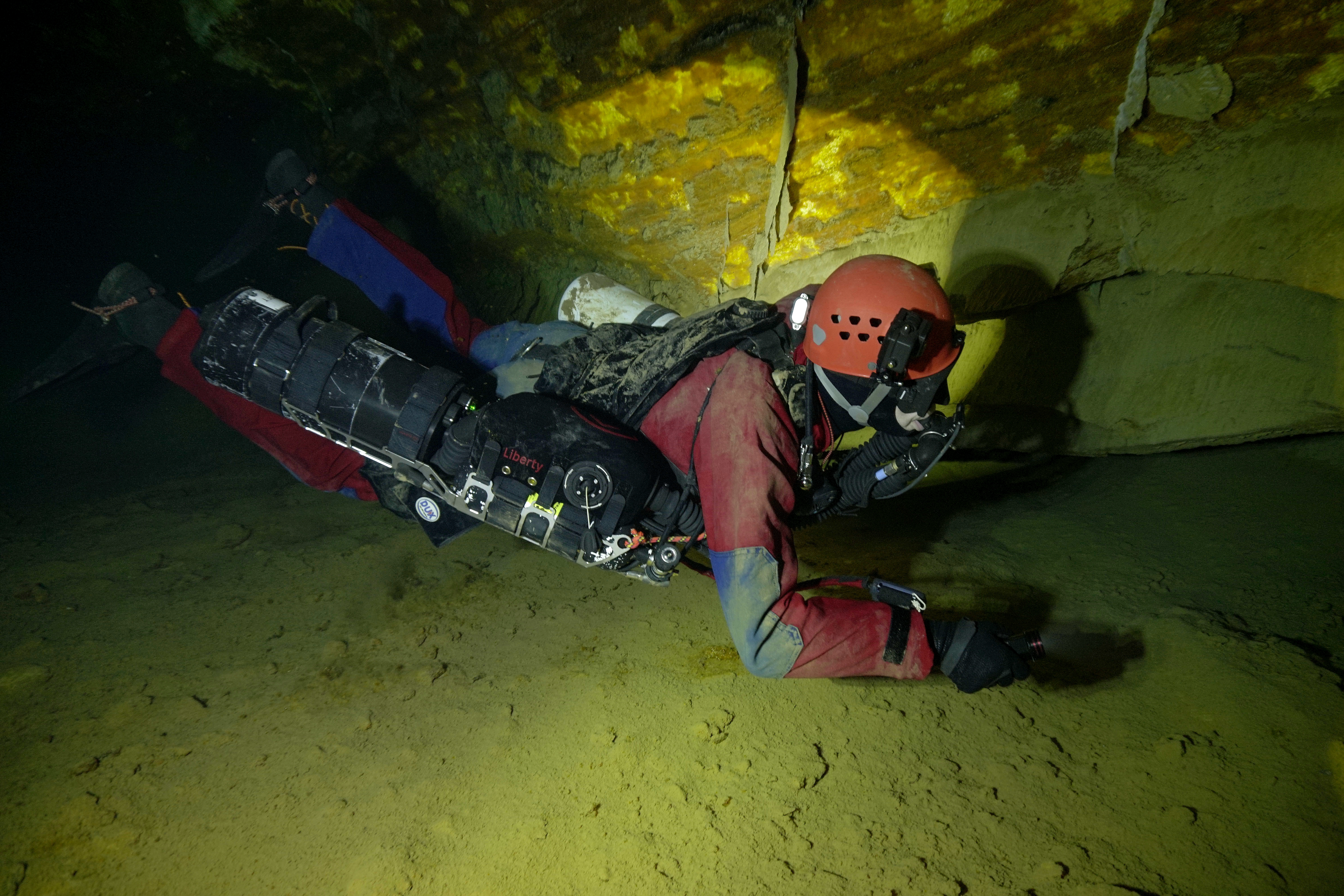
Liberty sidemount rebreather for low profile cave diving

Sidemount allows a low profile to penetrate tight restrictions in cave and wreck diving, and is convenient for carrying a bailout rebreather. A sidemount rebreather as the main breathing apparatus can be mounted on one side of the diver's body and can be balanced weight-wise and hydrodynamically by a large bailout cylinder side mounted on the other side. Sidemount rebreathers are sensitive to diver orientation, which can change hydrostatic work of breathing over a larger range than for back or chest mount, and the resisistive work of breathing is also relatively large due to the long breathing hoses and multiple bends necessary to fit the components into a long narrow format. As of 2019, no sidemount rebreather had passed the CE test for work of breathing. Sidemount rebreathers may also be more susceptible to major loop flooding due to lack of a convenient exhalation counterlung position to form a water trap.

Sidemount rebreathers usually use a form factor equivalent to a single sidemount open circuit cylinder, which mimics the streamlining of a sidemount cylinder, but has hydrostatic work of breathing variability issues if the unit isn't perfectly rigged and mounted. The work of breathing is only optimised when the diver is trimmed correctly.

The KISS Sidewinder is a sidemount MCCR that reduces this problem by mounting the two relatively small scrubber canisters on both sides of the diver, connected by a single 8-litre counterlung across the diver's back, and worn with a regular sidemount harness. This configuration is claimed to provide good work of breathing in most diver orientations. A small butt-mounted transverse oxygen cylinder and standard sidemount diluent/bailout cylinders (usually two) are carried.

== System variants ==
Rebreathers can be primarily categorised as diving rebreathers, intended for hyperbaric use, and other rebreathers used at pressures from slightly more than normal atmospheric pressure at sea level to significantly lower ambient pressure at high altitudes and in space. Diving rebreathers must often deal with the complications of avoiding hyperbaric oxygen toxicity, while normobaric and hypobaric applications can use the relatively trivially simple oxygen rebreather technology, where there is no requirement to monitor oxygen partial pressure during use providing the ambient pressure is sufficient.

== Mixed gas rebreathers ==
All rebreathers other than oxygen rebreathers may be considered mixed gas rebreathers. These can be divided into semi-closed circuit, where the supply gas is a breathable mixture containing oxygen and inert diluents, usually nitrogen and helium, and which is replenished by adding more of the mixture as the oxygen is used up, sufficient to maintain a breathable partial pressure of oxygen in the loop, and closed circuit rebreathers, where two parallel gas supplies are used: the diluent, to provide the bulk of the gas, and which is recycled, and oxygen, which is metabolically expended.

=== Semi-closed circuit rebreathers ===
These are almost exclusively used for underwater diving, as they are bulkier, heavier, and more complex than closed circuit oxygen rebreathers. Military and recreational divers use these because they provide better underwater duration than open circuit, have a deeper maximum operating depth than oxygen rebreathers and can be fairly simple and cheap. They do not rely on electronics for control of gas composition, but may use electronic monitoring for improved safety and more efficient decompression. An alternative term for this technology is "gas extender".

Semi-closed circuit equipment generally supplies one breathing gas such as air, nitrox or trimix at a time. The gas is injected into the loop at a constant rate to replenish oxygen consumed from the loop by the diver. Excess gas must be constantly vented from the loop in small volumes to make space for fresh, oxygen-rich gas. As the oxygen in the vented gas cannot be separated from the inert gas, semi-closed circuit is wasteful of both oxygen and inert components.

A gas mix which has a maximum operating depth that is safe for the depth of the dive being planned, and which will provide a breathable mixture at the surface must be used, or it will be necessary to change mixtures during the dive.

As the amount of oxygen required by the diver increases with work rate, the gas injection rate must be carefully chosen and controlled to prevent unconsciousness in the diver due to hypoxia. A higher gas addition rate reduces the likelihood of hypoxia but wastes more gas.

==== Passive addition semi-closed circuit ====
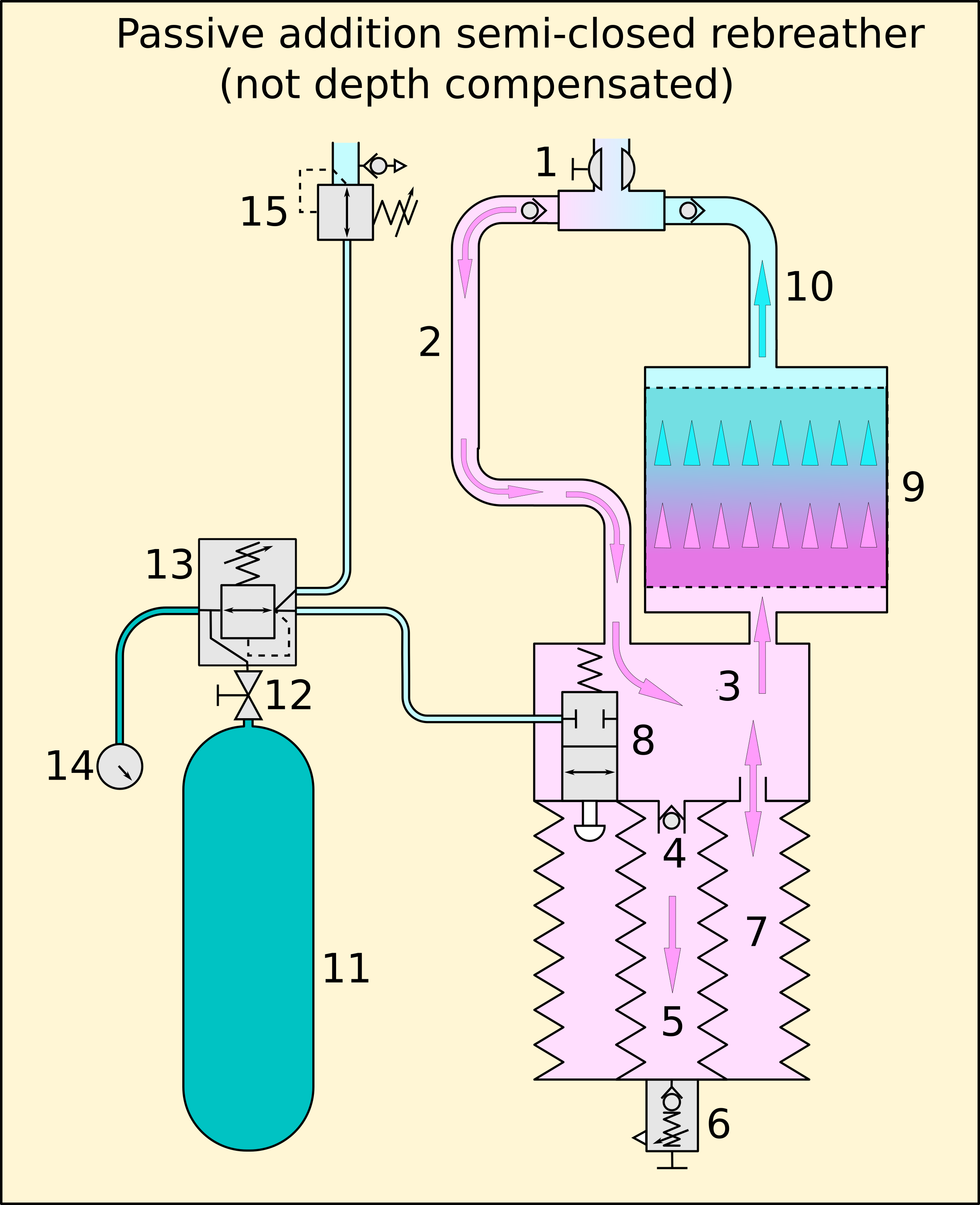
Schematic diagram of the breathing gas circuit of a passive addition semi-closed circuit rebreather.: 1 Dive/surface valve with loop non-return valves; 2 Exhalation hose; 3 Counterlung fore-chamber; 4 Non-return valve to discharge bellows; 5 Discharge bellows; 6 Overpressure valve; 7 Main counterlung bellows; 8 Addition valve; 9 Scrubber (axial flow); 10 Inhalation hose; 11 Breathing gas storage cylinder; 12 Cylinder valve; 13 Regulator first stage; 14 Submersible pressure gauge; 15 Bailout demand valve

This type of rebreather works on the principle of adding fresh gas to compensate for reduced volume in the breathing circuit. A portion of the respired gas is discharged that is in some way proportional to oxygen consumption. Generally it is a fixed volumetric fraction of the respiratory flow, but more complex systems have been developed which exhaust a close approximation of a ratio to the surface respiratory flow rate. These are described as depth compensated or partially depth compensated systems. Gas addition is triggered by low counterlung volume which activates a demand valve.

The simple case of a fixed ratio discharge can be achieved by concentric bellows counterlungs, where the exhaled gas expands both the counterlungs, and while the larger volume outer bellows discharges back to the loop when the diver inhales the next breath, the inner bellows discharges its contents to the surroundings, using non return valves to ensure a one-directional flow. The amount processed during each breath depends on the tidal volume of that breath.

Towards the end of inhalation the bellows bottoms out and activates an addition valve, in much the way that a regulator diaphragm activates the demand valve, to make up the gas discharged by the inner bellows. This type of rebreather therefore tends to operate at a minimal volume.

The fixed ratio systems usually discharge between 10% (1/10) and 25% (1/4) of the volume of each breath overboard. As a result, gas endurance is from 10 times to four times that of open circuit, and depends on breathing rate and depth in the same way as for open circuit. Oxygen fraction in the loop depends on the discharge ratio, and to a lesser extent on the breathing rate and work rate of the diver. As some gas is recycled after breathing, the oxygen fraction will always be lower than that of the make-up gas, but can closely approximate the make-up gas after a loop flush, so the gas is generally chosen to be breathable at maximum depth, which allows it to be used for open circuit bailout. The loop gas oxygen fraction will increase with depth, as the mass rate of metabolic oxygen use remains almost constant with a change in depth. This is the opposite tendency of what is done in a closed circuit rebreather, where the oxygen partial pressure is controlled to be more or less the same within limits throughout the dive. The fixed ratio system has been used in the DC55 and Halcyon RB80 rebreathers. Passive addition rebreathers with small discharge ratios may become hypoxic near the surface when moderate or low oxygen fraction supply gas is used, making it necessary to switch gases between deep and shallow diving.

The depth compensating systems discharge a portion of the diver's tidal volume which varies in inverse proportion to the absolute pressure. At the surface they generally discharge between 20% (1/5) and 33% (1/3) of each breath, but that decreases with depth, to keep the oxygen fraction in the loop approximately constant and reduce gas consumption. A fully depth compensated system will discharge a volume of gas, inversely proportional to pressure, so that the volume discharged at 90m depth (10 bar absolute pressure) will be 10% of the surface discharge. This system will provide an approximately fixed oxygen fraction regardless of depth, when used with the same make-up gas, because the effective mass discharge remains constant.

Partially depth compensating systems are part way between the fixed ratio and the depth compensating systems. They provide a high discharge ratio near the surface, but the discharge ratio is not fixed either as a proportion of respired volume or mass. Gas oxygen fraction is more difficult to calculate, but will be somewhere between the limiting values for fixed ratio and fully compensated systems. The Halcyon PVR-BASC uses a variable volume inner bellows system to compensate for depth.

==== Active addition semi-closed circuit ====
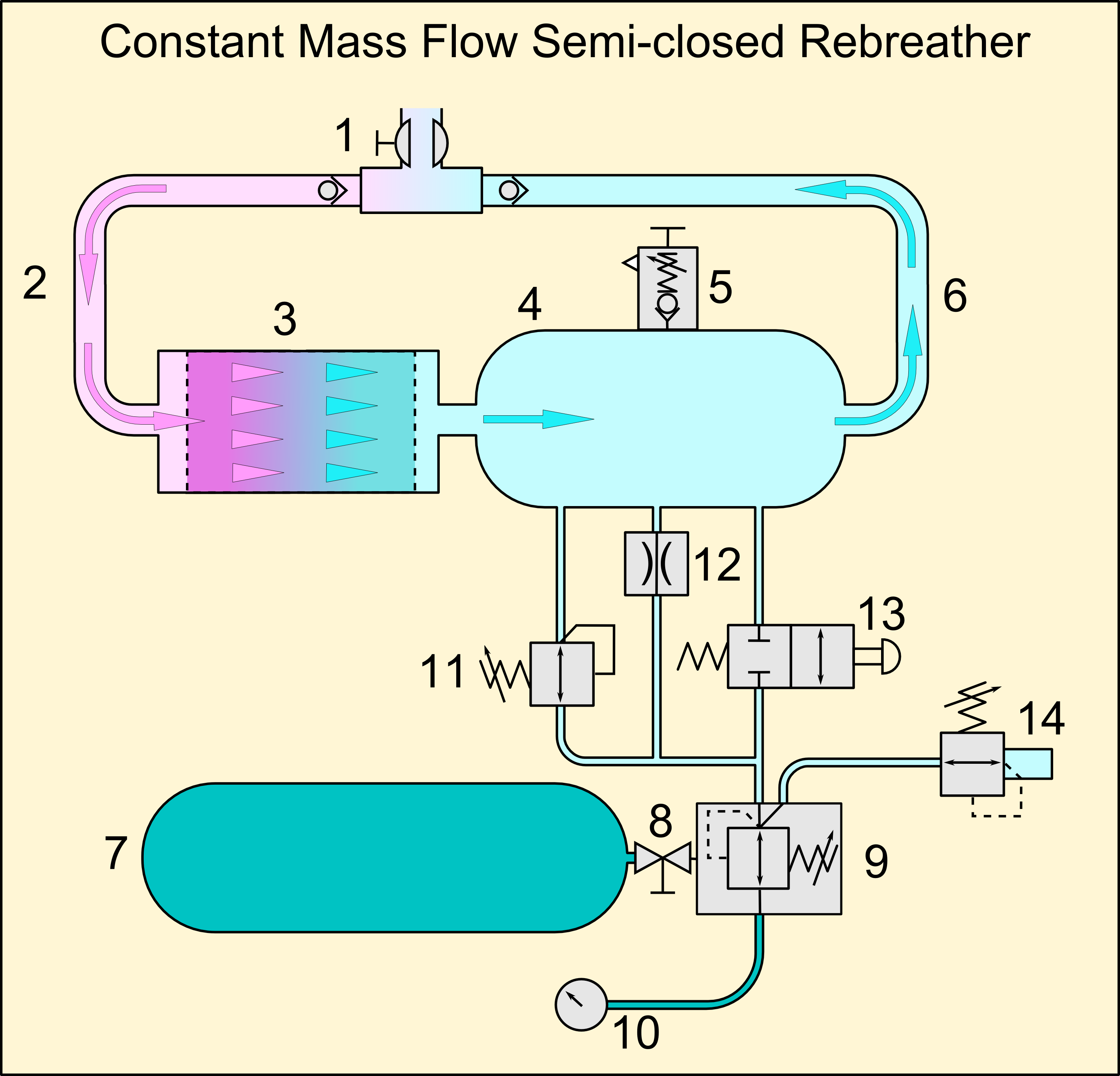
Diagram of the loop in a constant mass flow semi-closed circuit rebreather: 1 Dive/surface valve with loop non-return valves; 2 Exhaust hose; 3 Scrubber canister (axial flow); 4 Counterlung; 5 Loop overpressure valve; 6 Inhalation valve; 7 Breathing gas supply cylinder; 8 Cylinder valve; 9 Absolute pressure regulator; 10 Submersible pressure gauge; 11 Automatic Diluent Valve; 12 Constant Mass Flow metering orifice; 13 Manual bypass valve; 14 Bailout demand valve

An active addition system adds feed gas to the breathing circuit and excess gas is dumped to the environment. These rebreathers tend to operate near maximum volume.

===== Constant mass flow gas addition =====
The most common system of active addition of make-up gas in semi-closed rebreathers is by use of a constant mass flow injector, also known as choked flow. This is easily achieved by using a sonic orifice, as provided the pressure drop over the orifice is sufficient to ensure sonic flow, the mass flow for a specific gas will be independent of the downstream pressure. The mass flow through a sonic orifice is a function of the upstream pressure and the gas mixture, so the upstream pressure must remain constant for the working depth range of the rebreather to provide a reliably predictable mixture in the breathing circuit, and a modified regulator is used which is not affected by changes in ambient pressure. Gas addition is independent of oxygen use, and the gas fraction in the loop is strongly dependent on exertion of the diver – it is possible to dangerously deplete the oxygen by excessive physical exertion.

===== Demand controlled gas addition =====
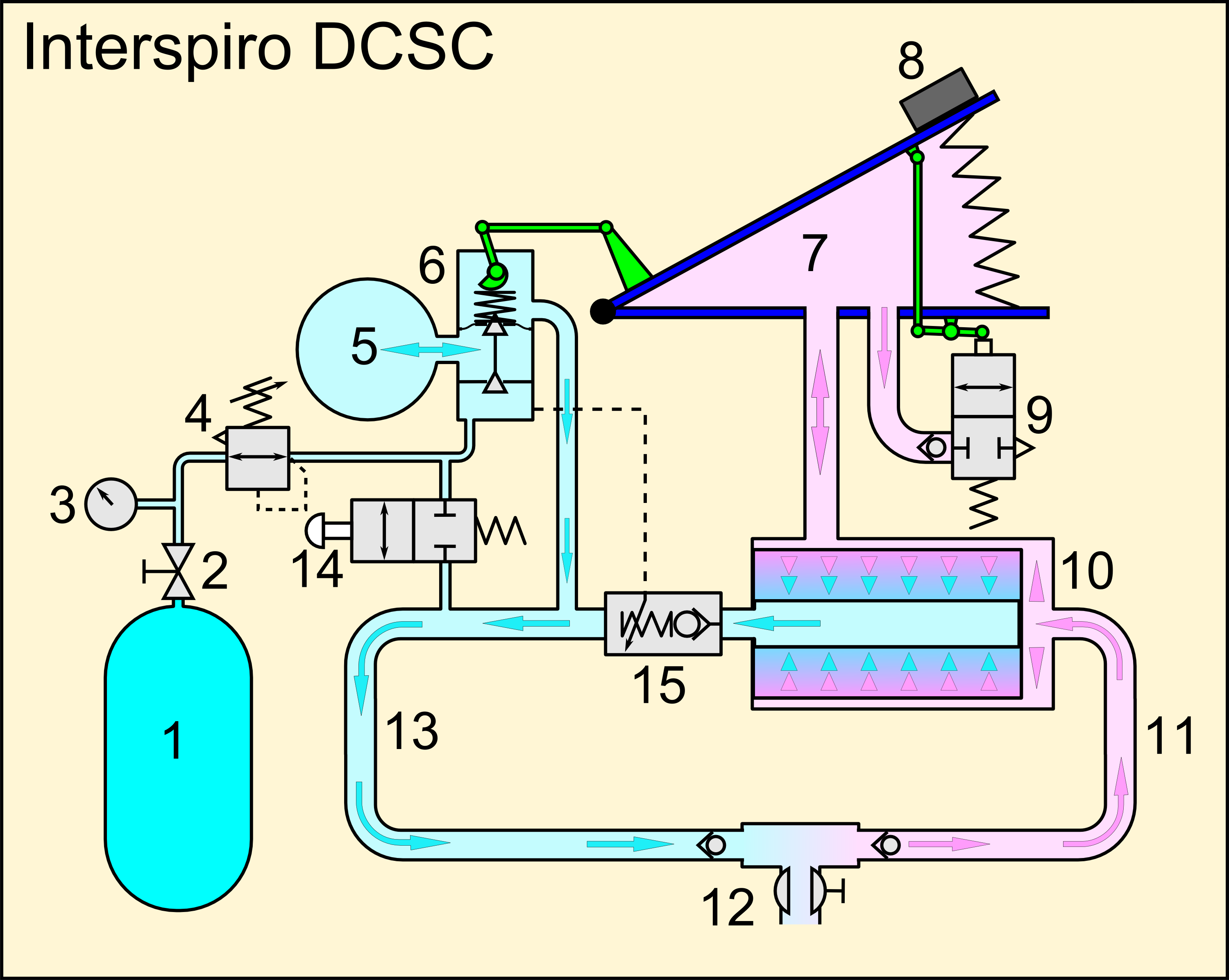
Schematic diagram of the breathing loop of the Interspiro DCSC semi-closed circuit rebreather: 1 Nitrox feed gas cylinder; 2 Cylinder valve; 3 Pressure gauge; 4 Feed gas first stage regulator; 5 Dosage chamber; 6 Dosage mechanism with control linkage from bellows cover; 7 Hinged bellows counterlung; 8 Bellows weight; 9 Exhaust valve with control linkage from bellows cover; 10 Radial flow scrubber; 11 Exhalation hose; 12 Mouthpiece with dive/surface valve and loop non-return valves; 13 Inhalation hose; 14 Manual bypass valve; 15 Low gas warning valve

Only one model using this gas mixture control principle has been marketed. This is the Interspiro DCSC. The principle of operation is to add a mass of oxygen that is proportional to the volume of each breath. This approach is based on the assumption that the volumetric breathing rate of a diver is directly proportional to metabolic oxygen consumption, which experimental evidence indicates is close enough to work.

The fresh gas addition is made by controlling the pressure in a dosage chamber proportional to the counterlung bellows volume. The dosage chamber is filled with fresh gas to a pressure proportional to bellows volume, with the highest pressure when the bellows is in the empty position. When the bellows fills during exhalation, the gas is released from the dosage chamber into the breathing circuit, proportional to the volume in the bellows during exhalation, and is fully released when the bellows is full. Excess gas is dumped to the environment through the overpressure valve after the bellows is full.

The result is the addition of a mass of gas proportional to ventilation volume, and the oxygen fraction is stable over the normal range of exertion.

The volume of the dosage chamber is matched to a specific supply gas mixture, and is changed when the gas is changed. The DCSC uses two standard mixtures of nitrox: 28% and 46%.

=== Closed circuit rebreathers ===
==== Oxygen rebreathers ====
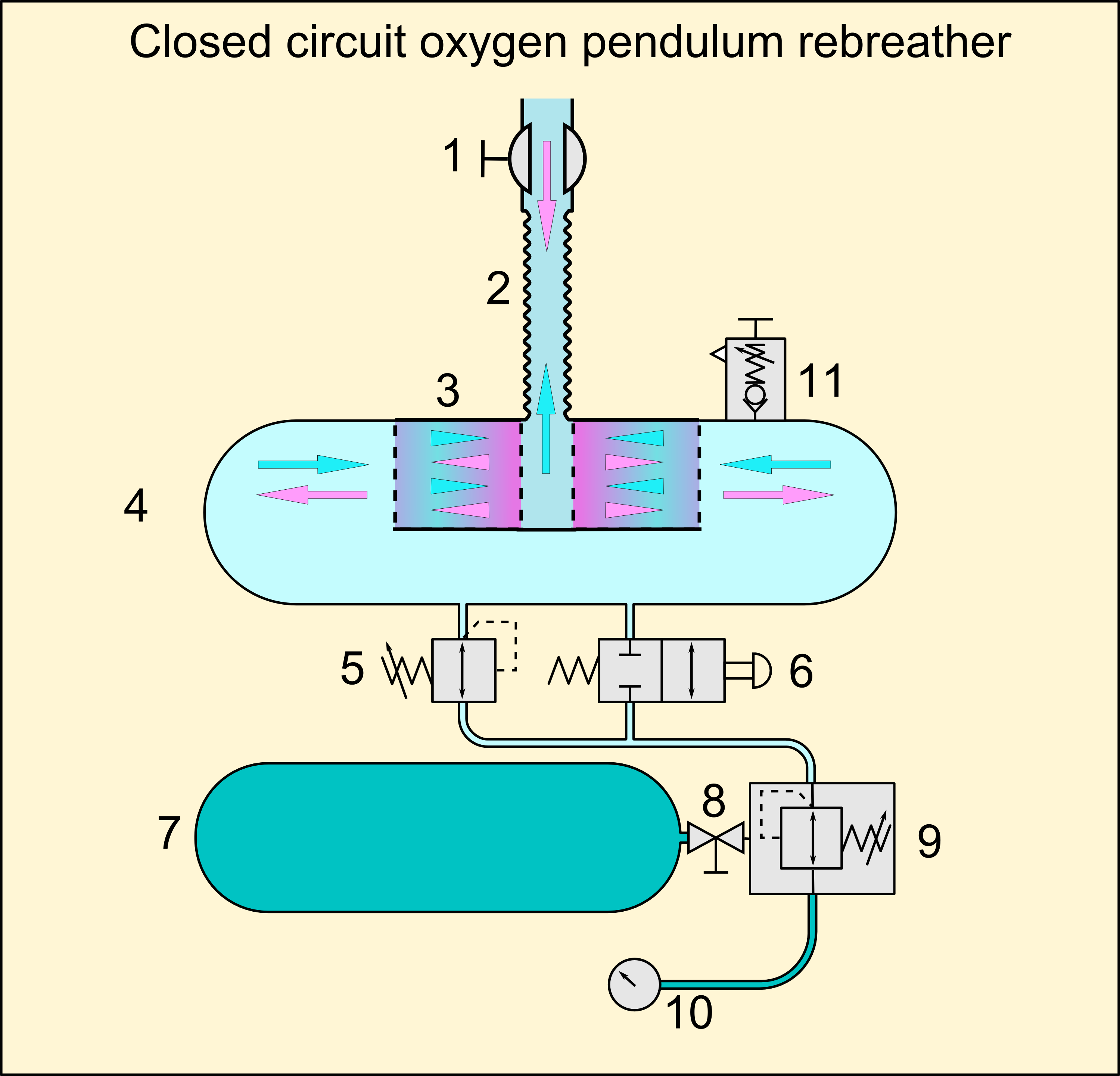
Schematic diagram of a closed circuit oxygen rebreather with a pendulum configuration and radial flow scrubber: 1 Dive/surface valve; 2 Two way breathing hose; 3 Scrubber (radial flow); 4 Counterlung; 5 Automatic make-up valve; 6 Manual bypass valve; 7 Breathing gas storage cylinder; 8 Cylinder valve; 9 Regulator first stage; 10 Submersible pressure gauge; 11 Overpressure valve

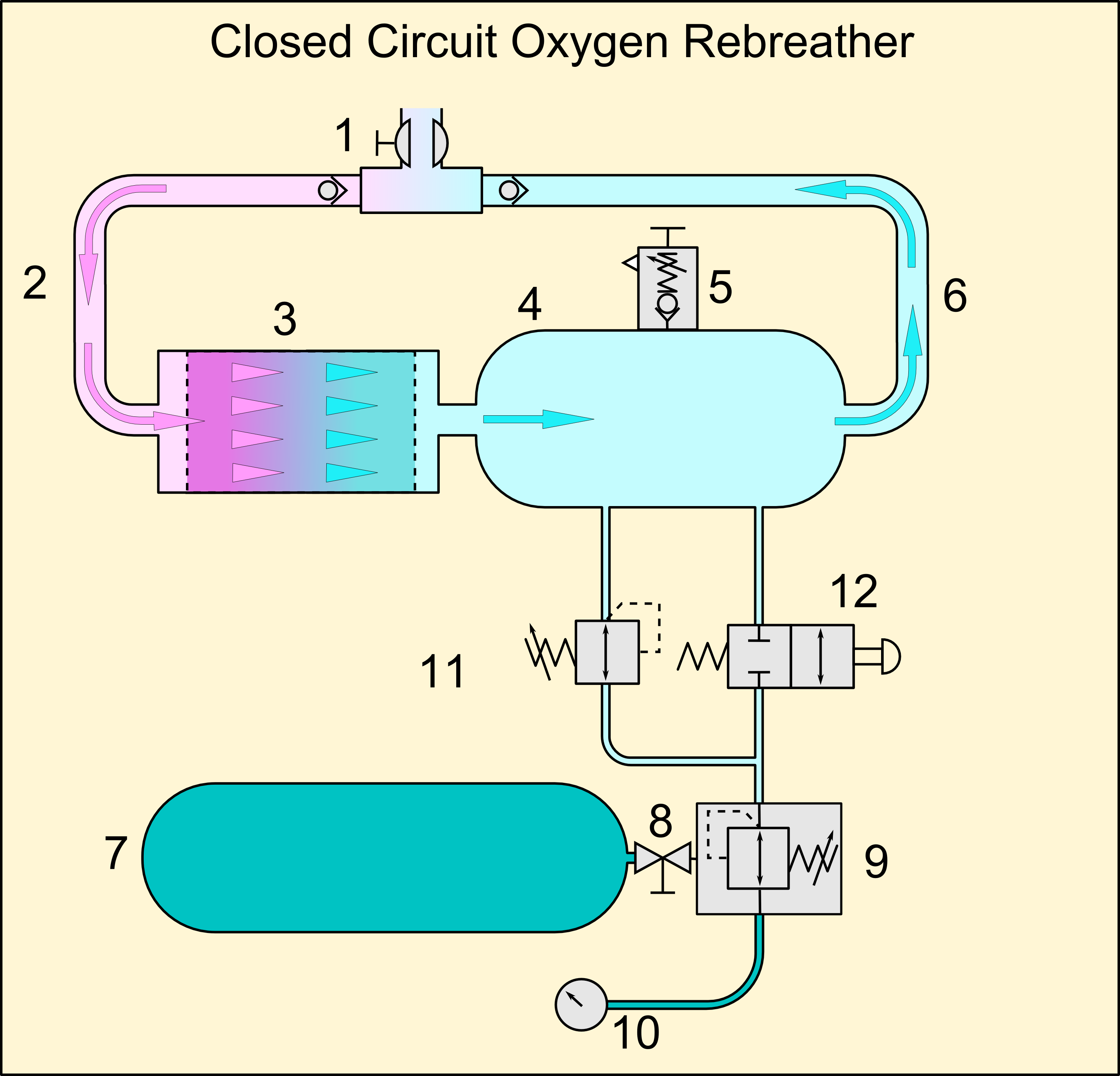
Schematic diagram of a closed circuit oxygen rebreather with a loop configuration and axial flow scrubber: 1 Dive/surface valve with loop non return valves; 2 Exhaust hose; 3 Scrubber (axial flow); 4 Counterlung; 5 Overpressure valve; 6 Inhalation hose; 7 Breathing gas storage cylinder; 8 Cylinder valve; 9 Regulator first stage; 10 Submersible pressure gauge; 11 Automatic make-up valve; 12 Manual bypass valve

This is the earliest type of rebreather and was commonly used by navies and for mine rescue from the early twentieth century. Oxygen rebreathers can be remarkably simple designs, and they were invented before open-circuit scuba. They only supply oxygen, so there is no requirement to control the gas mixture other than purging before use and removing the carbon dioxide.

===== Oxygen feed options =====
In some rebreathers, e.g. the Siebe Gorman Salvus, the oxygen cylinder has two oxygen supply mechanisms in parallel. One is constant flow, and the other is a manual on-off valve called a bypass valve. Both feed into the counterlung. There is no necessity for a second stage and the gas can be turned on and off at the cylinder valve.

Others, such as the USN Mk25 UBA, are supplied automatically via a demand valve on the counterlung, which will add gas at any time that the counterlung is emptied and the diver continues to inhale. Oxygen can also be added manually by a button which activates the demand valve, equivalent to the purge button on an open-circuit demand valve.

Some simple oxygen rebreathers had no automatic supply system, only the manual feed valve, and the diver had to operate the valve at intervals to refill the breathing bag as the volume of oxygen decreased below a comfortable level. This is task loading, but the diver cannot remain unaware of the need to top up. Control of the volume in the loop would also control buoyancy.

==== Closed circuit mixed gas rebreathers ====
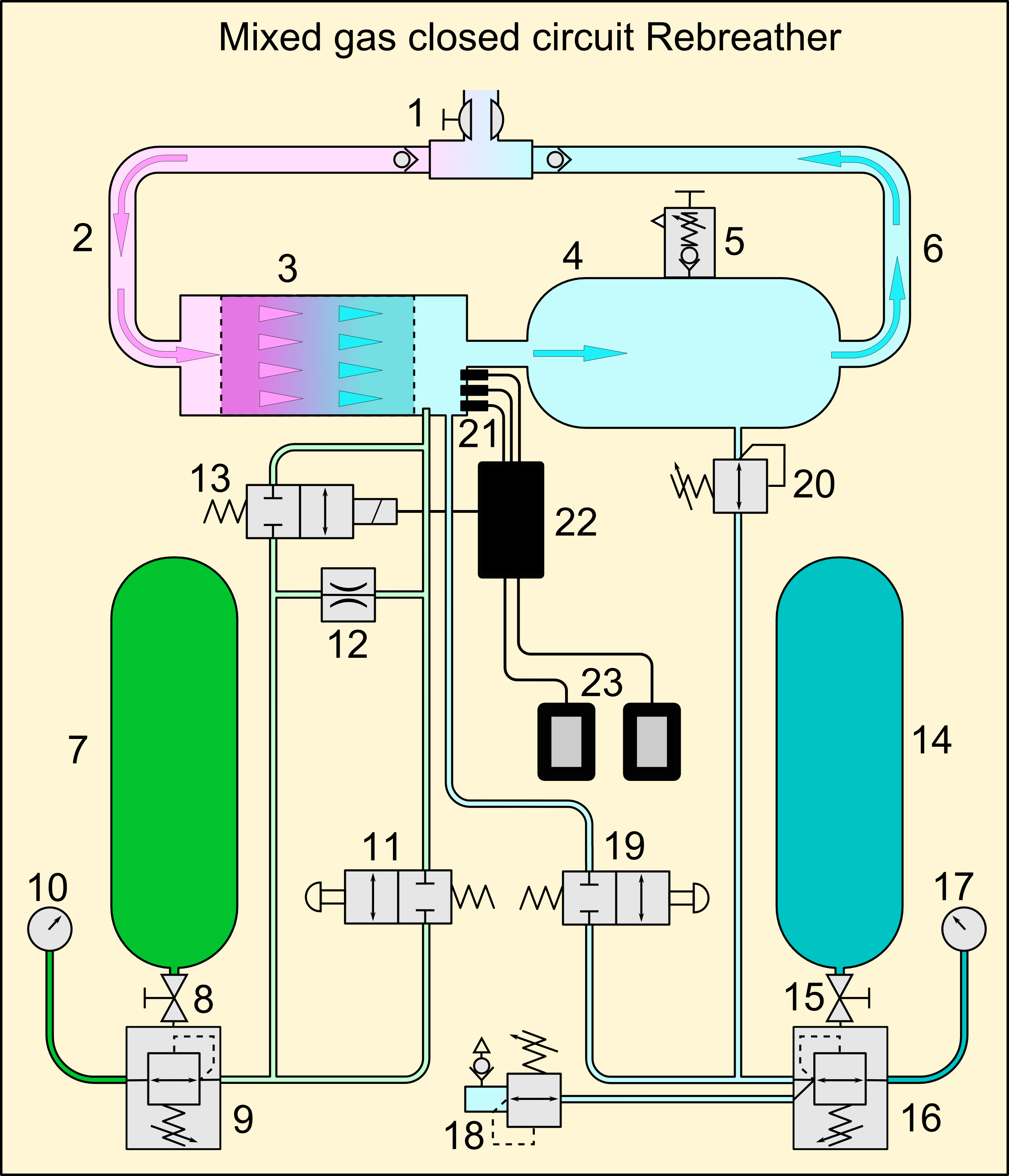
Schematic diagram of electronically controlled closed circuit mixed gas rebreather.: 1 Dive/surface valve and loop non-return valves; 2 Exhaust hose; 3 Scrubber (axial flow); 4 Counterlung; 5 Overpressure valve; 6 Inhalation valve; 7 Oxygen cylinder; 8 Oxygen cylinder valve; 9 Absolute pressure oxygen regulator; 10 Oxygen submersible pressure gauge; 11 Oxygen manual bypass valve; 12 Oxygen constant mass flow metering orifice; 13 Electronically controlled solenoid operated oxygen injection valve; 14 Diluent cylinder; 15 Diluent cylinder valve; 16 Diluent regulator; 17 Diluent submersible pressure gauge; 18 Bailout demand valve; 19 Manual diluent bypass valve; 20 Automatic diluent valve; 21 Oxygen sensor cells; 22 Electronic control and monitoring circuits; 23 Primary and secondary display units

Military, photographic, and recreational divers use closed circuit rebreathers because they allow long dives and produce no bubbles. Closed circuit rebreathers supply two breathing gases to the loop: one is pure oxygen and the other is a diluent or diluting gas such as air, nitrox, heliox or trimix.

A major function of the closed circuit rebreather is to control the oxygen partial pressure in the loop and to warn the diver if it becomes dangerously low or high. Too low a concentration of oxygen results in hypoxia leading to unconsciousness and ultimately death. Too high a concentration of oxygen results in hyperoxia, leading to oxygen toxicity, a condition causing convulsions which can make the diver lose the mouthpiece when they occur underwater, and can lead to drowning. The monitoring system uses oxygen-sensitive electro-galvanic fuel cells to measure the partial pressure of oxygen in the loop. The partial pressure of oxygen in the loop can generally be controlled within reasonable tolerance of a fixed value. This set point is chosen to provide an acceptable risk of both long-term and acute oxygen toxicity, while minimizing the decompression requirements for the planned dive profile.

The gas mixture is controlled by the diver in manually controlled closed circuit rebreathers. The diver can manually control the mixture by adding diluent gas or oxygen. Adding diluent can prevent the loop gas mixture becoming too oxygen rich, and adding oxygen is done to increase oxygen concentration.

In fully automatic closed-circuit systems, an electronically controlled solenoid valve injects oxygen into the loop when the control system detects that the partial pressure of oxygen in the loop has fallen below the required level. Electronically controlled CCRs can be switched to manual control in the event of some control system failures.

Addition of gas to compensate for compression during descent is usually done by an automatic diluent valve.

=== Standard diving dress rebreathers ===
In 1912 the German firm Drägerwerk of Lübeck introduced a version of standard diving dress using a gas supply from an oxygen rebreather and no surface supply. The system used a copper diving helmet and standard heavy diving suit with a back-mounted set of cylinders and scrubber. The breathing gas was circulated by using an injector system in the loop powered by the added gas. This was developed further with the Modell 1915 "Bubikopf" helmet and the DM20 oxygen rebreather system for depths up to 20 m, and the DM40 mixed gas rebreather which used an oxygen cylinder and an air cylinder for the gas supply, producing a nitrox mixture, for depths up to 40 m.

The US Navy developed a variant of the Mark V system for heliox diving. These were successfully used during the rescue of the crew and salvage of the USS Squalus in 1939. The US Navy Mark V Mod 1 heliox mixed gas helmet is based on the standard Mark V Helmet, with a scrubber canister mounted on the back of the helmet and an inlet gas injection system which recirculates the breathing gas through the scrubber to remove carbon dioxide and thereby conserve helium. The helium helmet uses the same breastplate as a standard Mark V except that the locking mechanism is relocated to the front, there is no spitcock, there is an additional electrical connection for heated underwear, and on later versions a two or three-stage exhaust valve was fitted to reduce the risk of flooding the scrubber. The gas supply at the diver was controlled by two valves. The "Hoke valve" controlled flow through the injector to the "aspirator" which circulated gas from the helmet through the scrubber, and the main control valve used for bailout to open circuit, flushing the helmet, and for extra gas when working hard or descending. Flow rate of the injector nozzle was nominally 0.5 cubic foot per minute at 100 psi above ambient pressure, which would blow 11 times the volume of the injected gas through the scrubber.

Both these systems were semi-closed and did not monitor partial pressures of oxygen. They both used an injector system to recirculate the breathing gas and did not increase work of breathing.

=== Rebreathers using an absorbent that releases oxygen ===
There have been a few rebreather designs (e.g. the Oxylite) which had an absorbent canister filled with potassium superoxide, which gives off oxygen as it absorbs carbon dioxide: 4KO_{2} + 2CO_{2} = 2K_{2}CO_{3} + 3O_{2}; it had a very small oxygen cylinder to fill the loop at the start of the dive. This system is dangerous because of the explosively hot reaction that happens if water gets on the potassium superoxide. The Russian IDA71 military and naval rebreather was designed to be run in this mode or as an ordinary rebreather.

Tests on the IDA71 at the United States Navy Experimental Diving Unit in Panama City, Florida showed that the IDA71 could give significantly longer dive time with superoxide in one of the canisters than without.

This technology may be applied to both oxygen and mixed gas rebreathers, and can be used for diving and other applications.

=== Rebreathers which use liquid oxygen ===
A liquid oxygen supply can be used for oxygen or mixed gas rebreathers. If used underwater, the liquid-oxygen container must be well insulated against heat transfer from the water. Industrial sets of this type may not be suitable for diving, and diving sets of this type may not be suitable for use out of water due to conflicting heat transfer requirements. The set's liquid oxygen tank must be filled immediately before use.

==== Cryogenic rebreather ====
A cryogenic rebreather removes the carbon dioxide by freezing it out in a "snow box" by the low temperature produced as liquid oxygen evaporates to replace the oxygen used.

A cryogenic rebreather prototype called the S-1000 was built by Sub-Marine Systems Corporation. It had a duration of 6 hours and a maximum dive depth of 200 metres (660 ft). Its ppO_{2} could be set to anything from 0.2 to 2 bars (3 to 30 psi) without electronics, by controlling the temperature of the liquid oxygen, thus controlling the equilibrium pressure of oxygen gas above the liquid. The diluent could be either nitrogen or helium depending on the depth of the dive. The partial pressure of oxygen was controlled by temperature, which was controlled by controlling the pressure at which liquid nitrogen was allowed to boil, which was controlled by an adjustable pressure relief valve. No control valves other than the nitrogen pressure relief valve were required. Low temperature was also used to freeze out up to 230 grams of carbon dioxide per hour from the loop, corresponding to an oxygen consumption of 2 litres per minute as carbon dioxide will freeze out of the gaseous state at -43.3 °C or below. If oxygen was consumed faster due to a high workload, a regular scrubber was needed. No electronics were needed as everything followed the setting of the nitrogen release pressure from the cooling unit, and the refrigeration by evaporation of liquid nitrogen maintained a steady temperature until the liquid nitrogen was exhausted. The loop gas flow was passed through a counterflow heat exchanger, which re-heated the gas returning to the diver by chilling the gas headed for the snow box (the cryogenic scrubber). The first prototype, the S-600G, was completed and shallow-water tested in October 1967. The S1000 was announced in 1969, but the systems were never marketed.

Cryogenic rebreathers were widely used in Soviet oceanography in the period 1980 to 1990.

== Components and subsystems ==
=== User respiratory interface ===
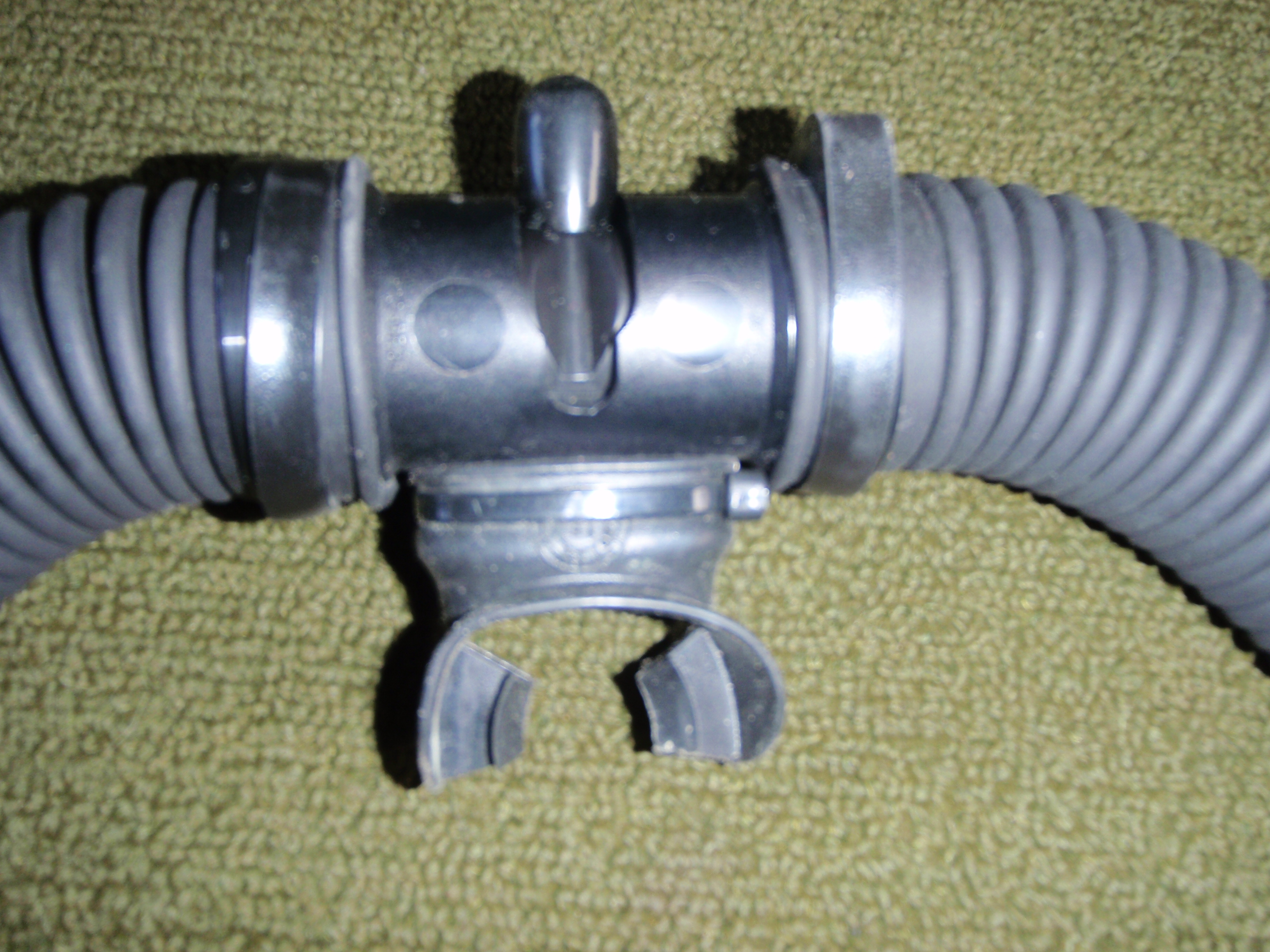
Mouthpiece with dive/surface valve of a Draeger Ray semi closed rebreather

The diver breathes from the rebreather circuit through a bite-grip mouthpiece or an oro-nasal mask which may be part of a full-face mask or diving helmet. The mouthpiece is connected to the rest of the rebreather by flexible breathing hoses. The mouthpiece of a diving rebreather will usually include a shutoff valve, and may incorporate a dive/surface valve or a bailout valve or both. On loop-configured rebreathers, the mouthpiece is usually the place where the non-return valves for the loop are fitted.

==== Dive/surface valve ====
The dive/surface valve (DSV) is a valve on the mouthpiece which can switch between the loop and ambient surroundings. It is used to close the loop at the surface to allow the diver to breathe atmospheric air, and may also be used underwater to isolate the loop so that it will not flood if the mouthpiece is taken out of the mouth.

==== Bailout valve ====
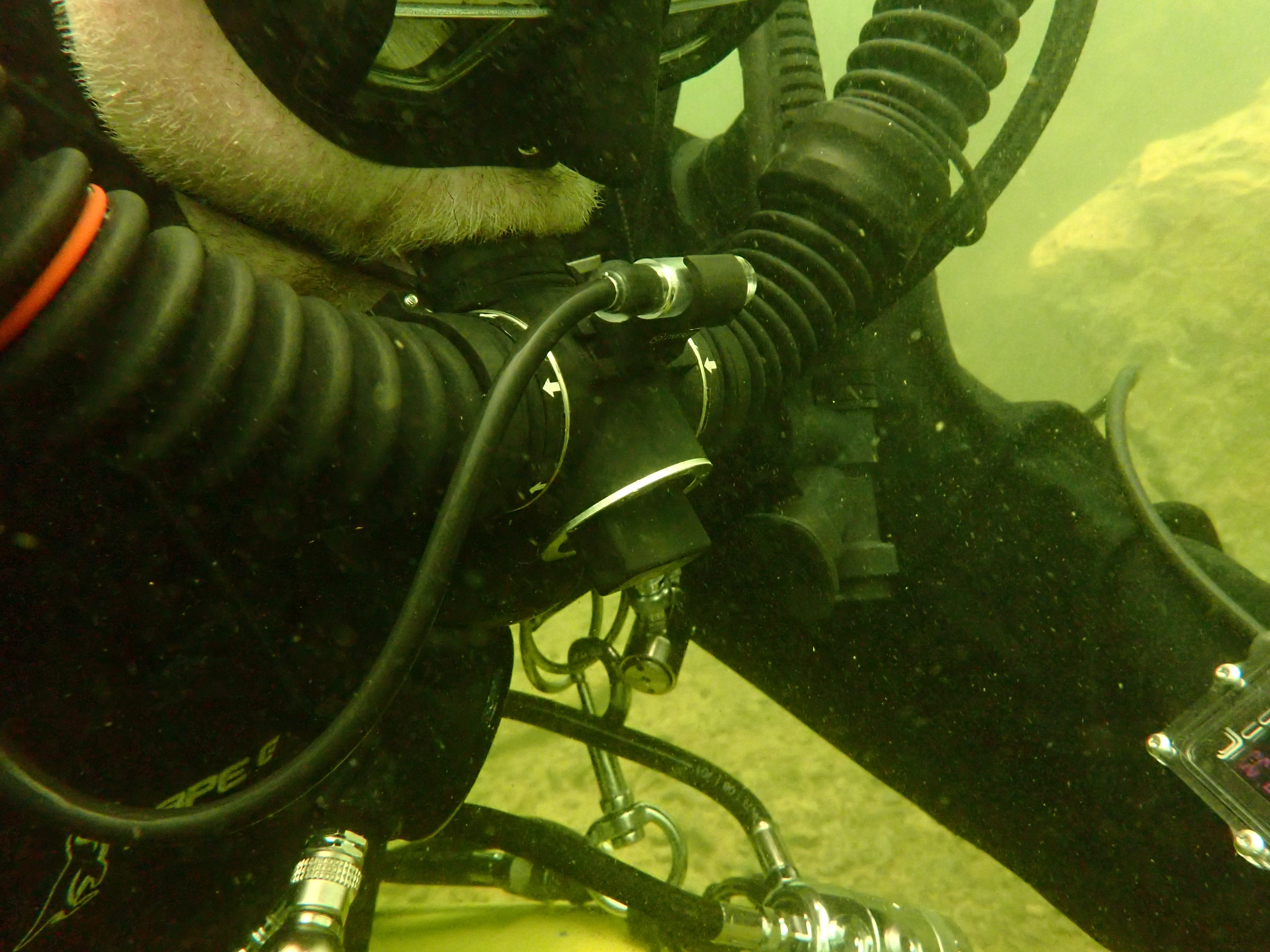
Mouthpiece with bailout valve and head-up display

A dive/surface valve which can be switched to close the loop and simultaneously open a connection to an open circuit demand valve is known as a bailout valve (BOV), as its function is to switch over to open circuit bailout without having to remove the mouthpiece. An important safety device when carbon dioxide poisoning occurs.

==== Mouthpiece retaining strap ====
A mouthpiece retaining strap (MRS) is an item of safety equipment which is a mandatory design feature for rebreathers sold in the EU and UK, following European rebreather standard EN14143:2013. Mouthpiece retaining straps have been shown in navy experience over several years to be effective at protecting the airway in an unconscious rebreather diver as an alternative to a full-face mask. The arrangement is required to be adjustable or self adjusting, to hold the mouthpiece firmly and comfortably in the user's mouth, and to maintain a seal. The MRS also reduces stress on the jaw during the dive.

=== Breathing hoses ===
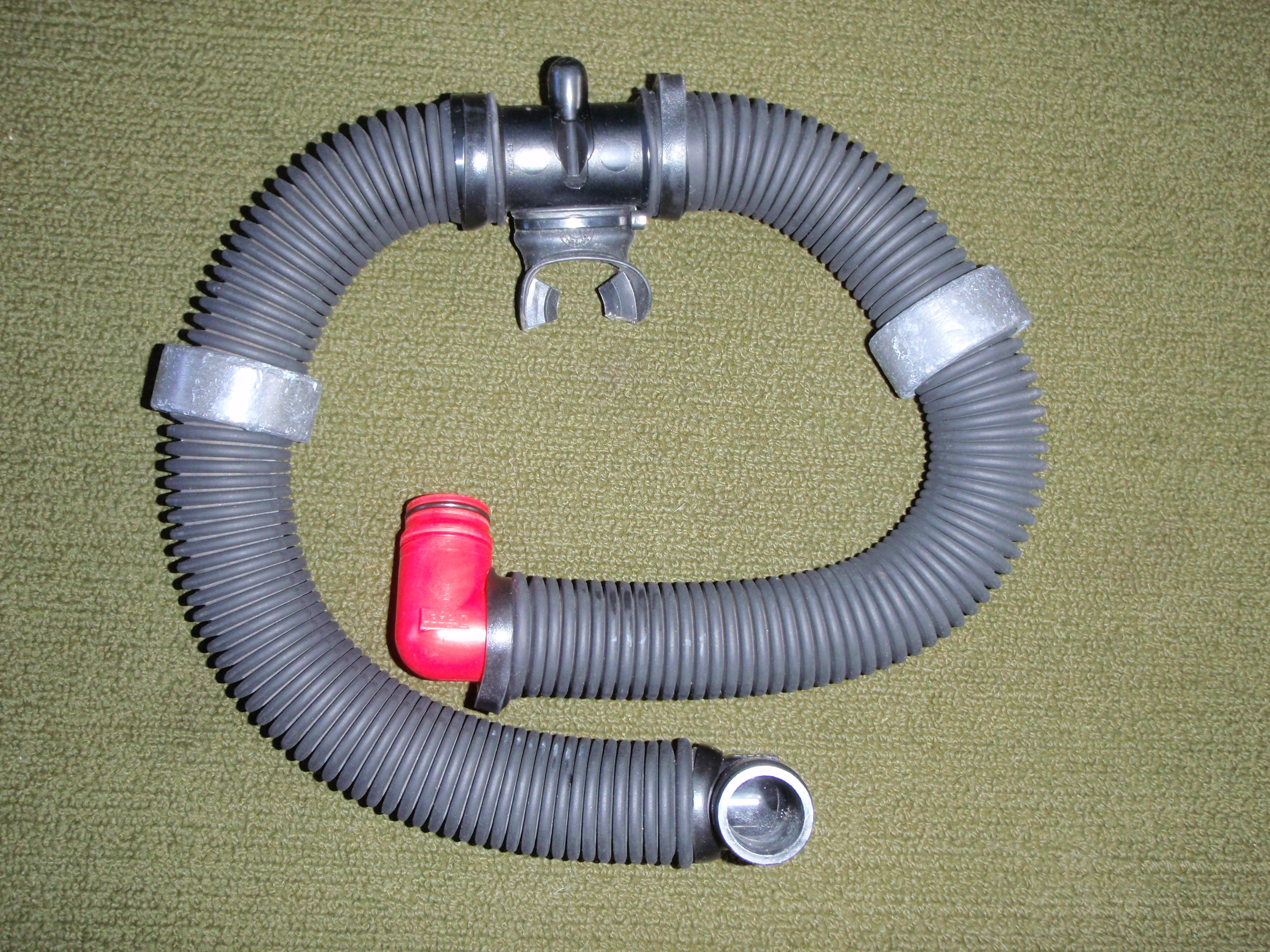
Dive-surface valve and breathing hoses of a Draeger Ray semi closed rebreather. Two hose weights are shown

Flexible corrugated synthetic rubber hoses are used to connect the mouthpiece to the rest of the breathing circuit, as these allow free movement of the diver's head. These hoses are corrugated to allow greater flexibility while retaining a high resistance to collapse. The hoses are designed to provide low resistance to flow of the breathing gas. A single breathing hose is used for pendulum (push-pull) configuration, and two hoses for a one-way loop configuration. Hose weights may be used to reduce excessive buoyancy.

=== Counterlungs ===
The counterlung is a part of the loop which is designed to change in volume by the same amount as the user's tidal volume when breathing. This lets the loop expand and contract when the user breathes, letting the total volume of gas in the lungs and the loop remain constant throughout the breathing cycle. The volume of the counterlung should allow for the maximum likely breath volume of a user, but does not generally need to match the vital capacity of all possible users.

Underwater, the position of the counterlung – on the chest, over the shoulders, or on the back – has an effect on the hydrostatic work of breathing. This is due to the pressure difference between the counterlung and the diver's lung caused by the vertical distance between the two.

Recreational, technical and many professional divers will spend most of their time underwater swimming face down and trimmed horizontally. Counterlungs should function well with low work of breathing in this position, and with the diver upright.

- Front mounted: When horizontal they are under greater hydrostatic pressure than the diver's lungs. Easier to inhale, harder to exhale.
- Back mounted: When horizontal they are under less hydrostatic pressure than the diver's lungs. The amount varies, as some are closer to the back than others. Harder to inhale, easier to exhale.
- Over the shoulder: The hydrostatic pressure will vary depending on how much gas is in the counterlungs, and increases as the volume increases and the lowest part of the gas space moves downward. The resistive work of breathing often negates the gains of good positioning close to the lung centroid.

The design of the counterlungs can also affect the swimming diver's streamlining due to location and shape of the counterlungs, if they are not in a casing.

A rebreather which uses rubber counterlungs which are not in an enclosed casing should be sheltered from sunlight when not in use, to prevent the rubber from perishing due to ultraviolet light.

==== Concentric bellows counterlungs ====
Most passive addition semi-closed diving rebreathers control the gas mixture by removing a fixed volumetric proportion of the exhaled gas, and replacing it with fresh feed gas from a demand valve, which is triggered by low volume of the counterlung.

This is done by using concentric bellows counterlungs – the counterlung is configured as a bellows with a rigid top and bottom, and has a flexible corrugated membrane forming the side walls. There is a second, smaller bellows inside, also connected to the rigid top and bottom surfaces of the counterlung, so that as the rigid surfaces move towards and away from each other, the volumes of the inner and outer bellows change in the same proportion.

The exhaled gas expands the counterlungs, and some of it flows into the inner bellows. On inhalation, the diver only breathes from the outer counterlung – return flow from the inner bellows is blocked by a non-return valve. The inner bellows also connects to another non-return valve opening to the outside environment, and thus the gas from the inner bellows is dumped from the circuit in a fixed proportion of the volume of the inhaled breath. If the counterlung volume is reduced sufficiently for the rigid cover to activate the feed gas demand valve, gas will be added until the diver finishes that inhalation.

=== Carbon dioxide scrubber ===
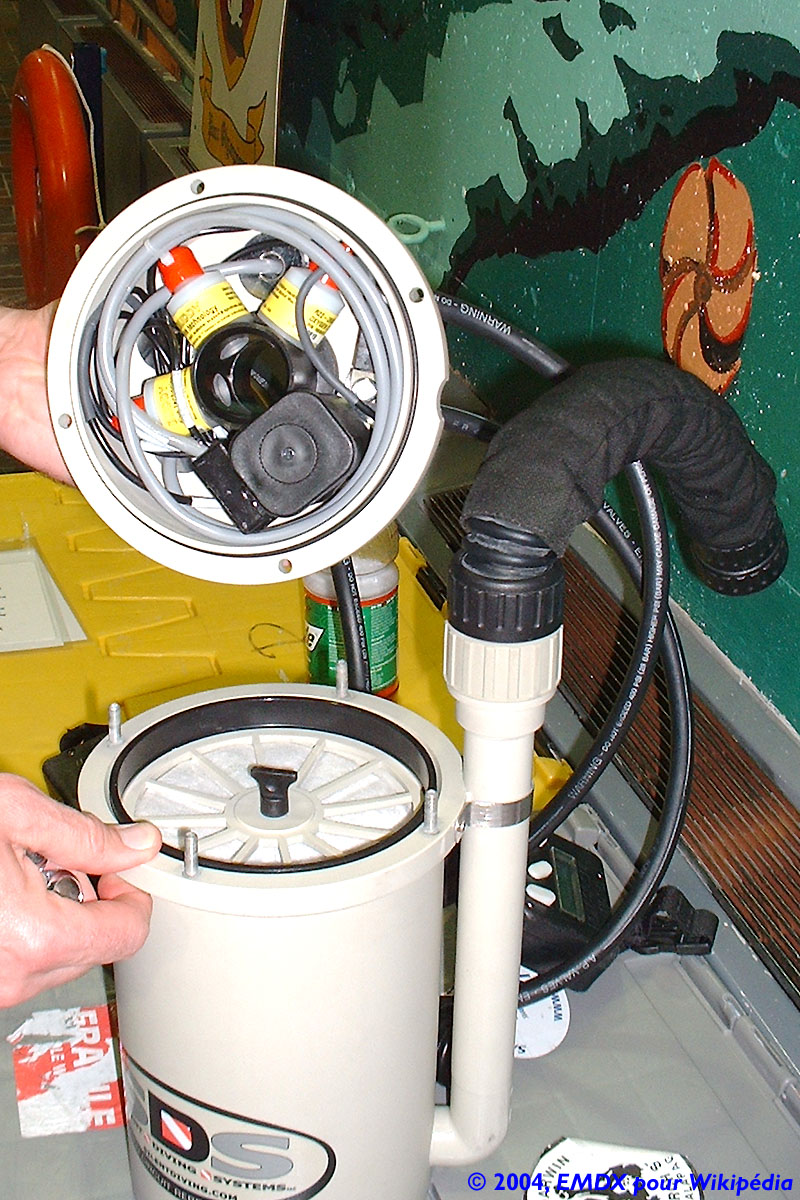
Inspiration scrubber canister

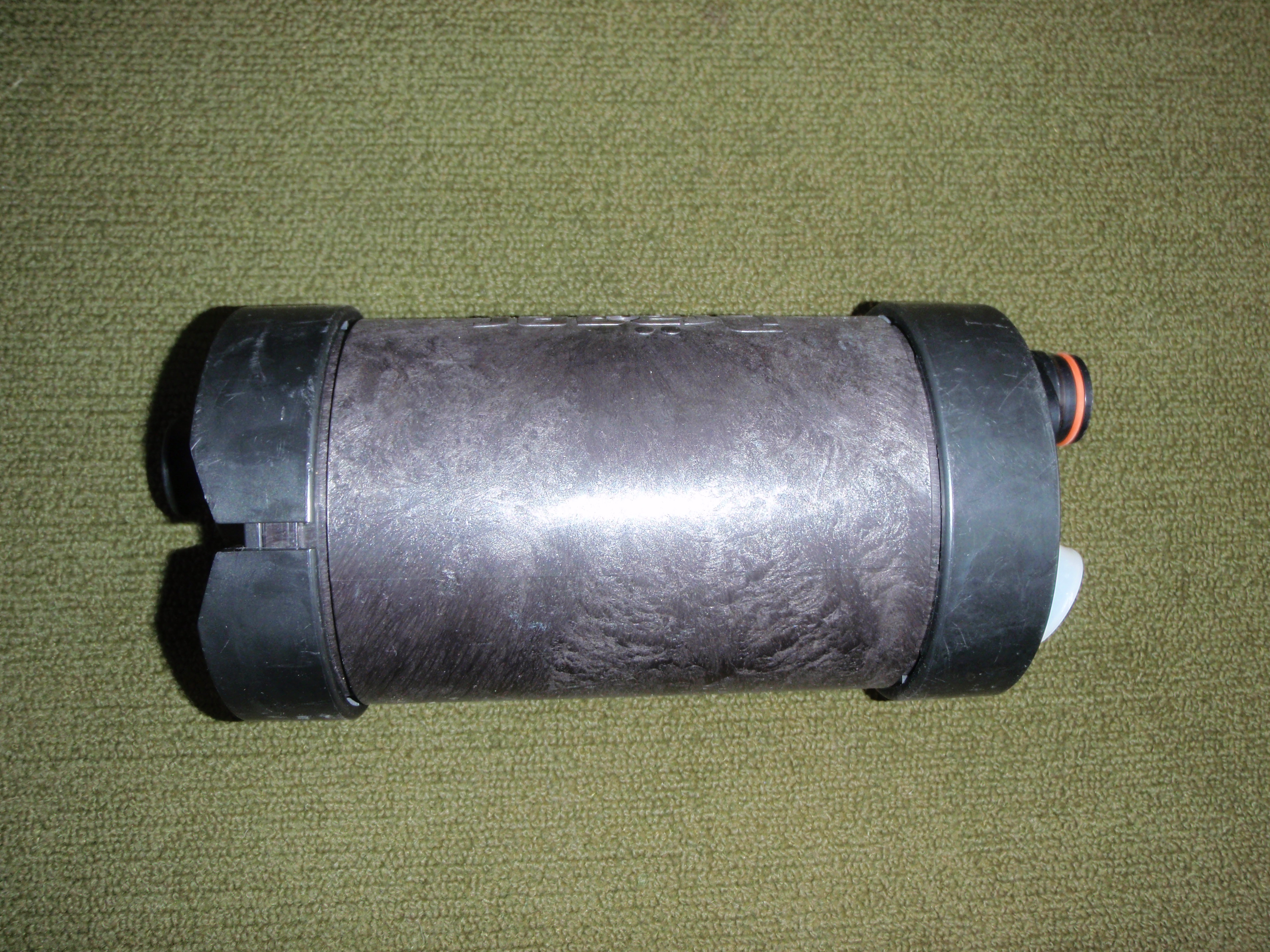
Scrubber canister of a Draeger Ray semi closed rebreather

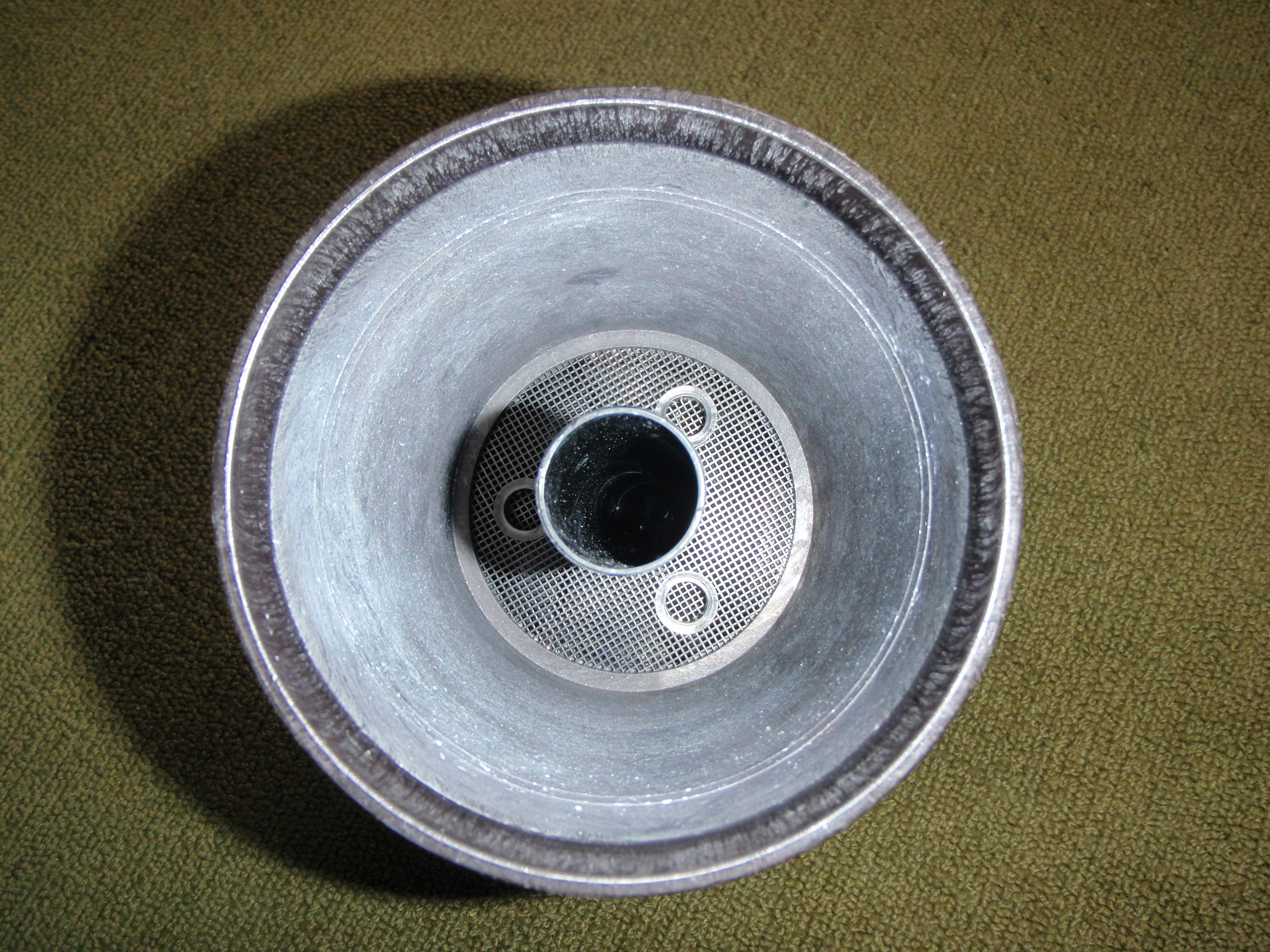
Interior of scrubber canister of a Draeger Ray semi closed rebreather

The exhaled gases are directed through the chemical scrubber, a canister full of a suitable carbon dioxide absorbent such as a form of soda lime, which removes the carbon dioxide from the gas mixture and leaves the oxygen and other gases available for re-breathing.

Some of the absorbent chemicals are produced in granular format for diving applications, such as Atrasorb Dive, Sofnolime, Dragersorb, or Sodasorb. Other systems use a prepackaged Reactive Plastic Curtain (RPC) based cartridge: The term Reactive Plastic Curtain was originally used to describe Micropore's absorbent curtains for emergency submarine use by the US Navy, and more recently RPC has been used to refer to their Reactive Plastic Cartridges, which are claimed to provide better and more reliable performance than the same volume of granular absorbent material.

The carbon dioxide passing through the scrubber absorbent is removed when it reacts with the absorbent in the canister; this chemical reaction is exothermic. Most of this reaction occurs along a "front" which is a region across the flow of gas through the soda-lime in the canister. This front moves through the scrubber canister, from the gas input end to the gas output end, as the reaction consumes the active ingredients. This front would be a zone with a thickness depending on the grain size, reactivity, and gas flow velocity because the carbon dioxide in the gas going through the canister needs time to reach the surface of a grain of absorbent, and then time to penetrate to the interior of each grain of absorbent as the outside of the grain becomes exhausted. Eventually gas with remaining carbon dioxide will reach the far end of the canister and "breakthrough" will occur. After this the carbon dioxide content of the scrubbed gas will tend to rise as the effectiveness of the scrubber falls until it becomes noticeable to the user, then unbreathable.

In rebreather diving, the typical effective endurance of the scrubber will be half an hour to several hours of breathing, depending on the grain size distribution and composition of the absorbent, the ambient temperature, the size of the canister, the dwell time of the gas in the absorbent material, and the production of carbon dioxide by the diver.

==== Scrubber design and size ====
Scrubber design and size is a compromise between bulk, cost of consumables, and work of breathing. Bulk affects the size of the unit and the amount of ballast weight needed, which affect the logistics of the dive. Work of breathing can be safety critical at greater depths, where it can become a significant part of the available aerobic work capacity of the diver, and can be overwhelming when it exceeds the diver's limit.

===== Single or multiple scrubbers =====
The usual arrangement is a single scrubber, but configurations with two scrubbers have been used, such as the IDA71, which has the scrubbers mounted in parallel (for some applications one of them may be filled with a superoxide type absorbent, which generates oxygen to replace the carbon dioxide) and the KISS Sidewinder, which has the scrubbers in series, with a single back mounted counterlung between the scrubbers so that transverse buoyancy shifts do not occur during the breathing cycle.

===== Axial or radial flow =====
The scrubber gas flow path may be axial, where the gas flows in at one end and out at the other, or radial, where the gas flows from the centre of the scrubber to the periphery (usually) or vice versa. The flow path should be of consistent length to minimise early breakthrough of some parts of the scrubber, which constrains radial designs to circular cylinders of variable length to diameter ratio, and axial scrubbers to approximately constant sectional shape along the flow (length) axis.

===== Grain size and size distribution =====
The distribution of grain sizes of the sorb affects the porosity of the packed canister. a wider distribution of grain size gives a low porosity. Porosity ranges from about 32% for uniformly sized (well sorted) approximately spherical grains down to less than 12% for a poorly sorted grain sizes with a large standard deviation, where the smaller granules occupy much of the space between the larger granules. A low porosity requires higher flow velocity for the same volume flow rate in the same scrubber canister. High flow rate produces high frictional resistance and low residence time (dwell time). The high resistance causes high work of breathing, and the low residence time makes breakthrough of carbon dioxide from the far side of the sorb occur sooner, i.e; shorter canister duration.

===== Effect of temperature on scrubber endurance =====
The scrubber absorbent (sorb) reaction rate is reduced at lower temperatures due to lower kinetic energy of gas molecules reducing the mean time before contact with the reactive material (Arrhenius equation). The sorb reaction releases heat, and cold water surroundings absorb heat through the canister walls, so the reaction front moves from the inlet end to outlet end, heating the sorb, and the heat is lost through the walls, which are around the sides in axial flow canisters. Carbon dioxide gets further through the colder parts of the sorb before it is absorbed, so tends to break through along the walls first. Breakthrough occurs in practice at about 50% of the theoretical canister endurance in 1.7 °C water. This effect can be reduced by insulating the canister walls where they are in contact with absorbent material

=== Gas venting – Overpressure valve and diffuser ===
During ascent the gas in the breathing circuit will expand, and must have some way of escape before the pressure difference causes injury to the diver or damage to the loop. The simplest way to do this is for the diver to allow excess gas to escape around the mouthpiece or through the nose, but a simple overpressure valve is reliable and can be adjusted to control the permitted overpressure. The overpressure valve is typically mounted on the counterlung and in military diving rebreathers it may be fitted with a diffuser, which helps to conceal the diver's presence by masking the release of bubbles, by breaking them up to sizes which are less easily detected. A diffuser also reduces bubble noise.

=== Loop drainage ===
Many rebreathers have "water traps" in the counterlungs or scrubber casing, to stop large volumes of water from entering the scrubber media if the diver removes the mouthpiece underwater without closing the valve, or if the diver's lips get slack and let water leak in. Some rebreathers have manual pumps to remove water from the water traps, and a few of the passive addition SCRs automatically pump water out along with the gas during the exhaust stroke of the bellows counterlung. Others use internal pressure to expel water through the manually overridden dump valve when it is in a low position.

=== Gas sources ===
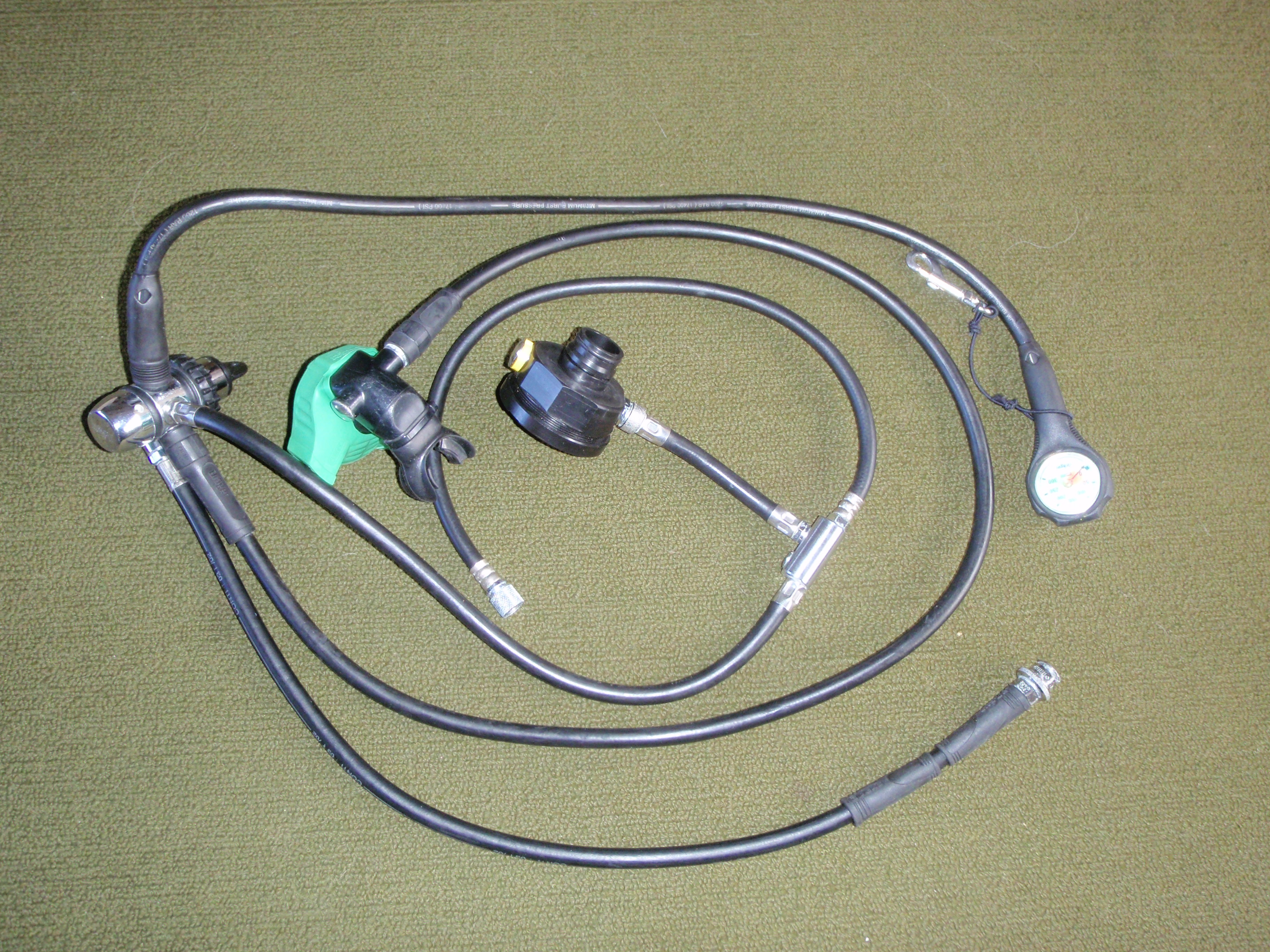
Regulator, bailout DV, CMF dosage and ADV, SPG and hoses from a Draeger Ray semi-closed rebreather

A rebreather must have a source of oxygen to replenish that which is consumed by the diver. Depending on the rebreather design variant, the oxygen source will either be pure oxygen or a breathing gas mixture, which is almost always stored in a gas cylinder. In a few cases oxygen is supplied as liquid oxygen or from a chemical reaction.

==== Diluent gas ====
Pure oxygen is not considered to be safe for recreational diving deeper than 6 meters, so closed circuit rebreathers for deeper use also have a cylinder of diluent gas. This diluent cylinder may be filled with compressed air or another diving gas mix such as nitrox, trimix, or heliox. The diluent reduces the percentage of oxygen breathed and increases the maximum operating depth of the rebreather. The diluent is not normally an oxygen-free gas, such as pure nitrogen or helium, and is breathable so it may be used in an emergency either to flush the loop with breathable gas of a known composition or as a bailout gas. Diluent gas is commonly referred to as diluent, dilutant, or just "dil" by divers. Diluent gas composition also affects gas density, and thereby the work of breathing at depth.

==== Gas addition valves ====
Gas must be added to the breathing loop if the volume gets too small or if it is necessary to change the gas composition.

===== Automatic diluent valve (ADV) =====
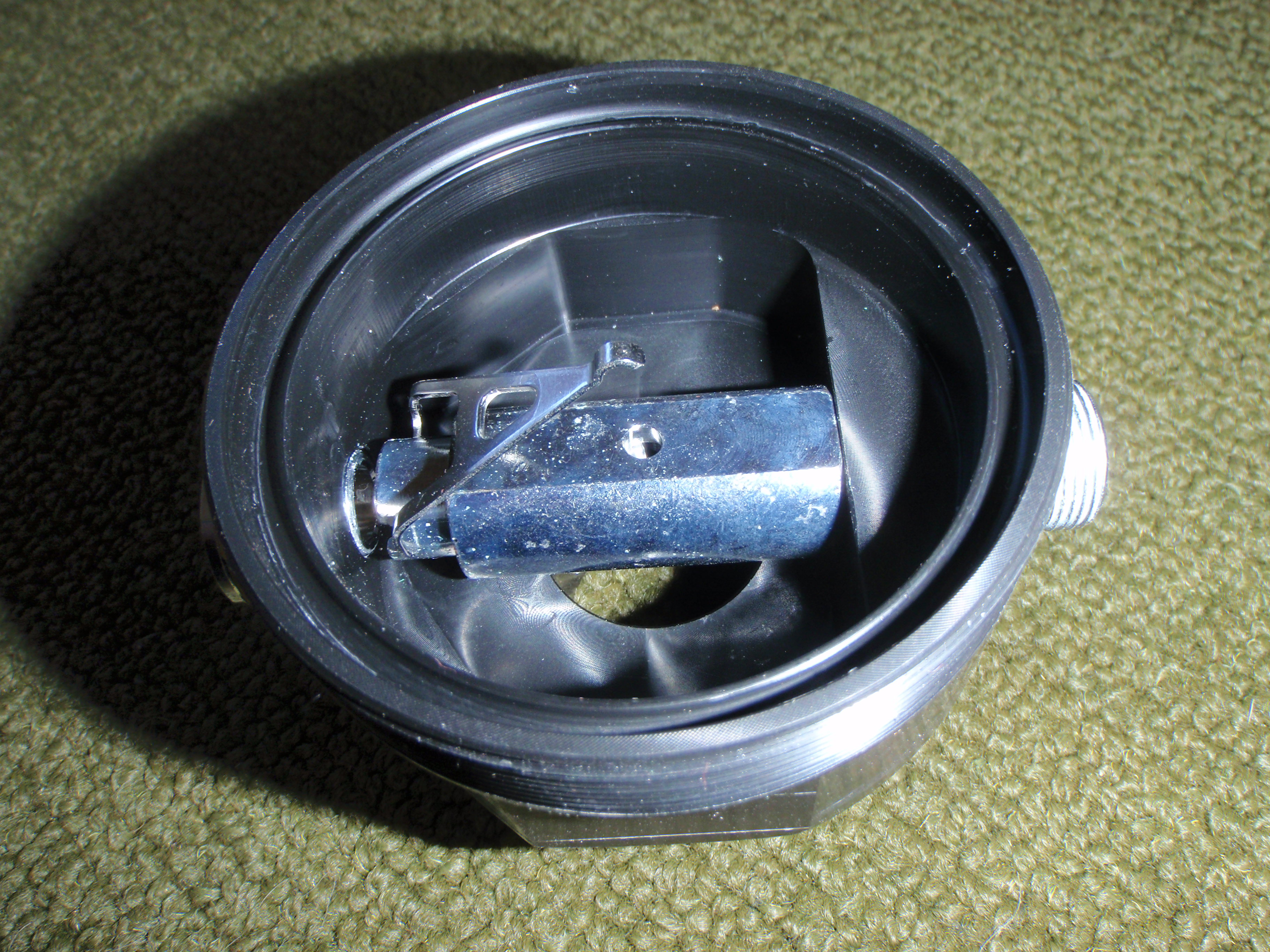
Internal view of a constant mass flow orifice and automatic diluent valve from a Draeger Ray semi-closed rebreather

This has a similar function to an open circuit demand valve., and in many cases uses the mechanism from a commonly available open circuit demand valve. It adds gas to the circuit if the volume in the circuit is too low. The mechanism is either operated by a dedicated diaphragm like in a scuba second stage, or may be operated by the top of a bellows type counterlung reaching the bottom of its travel.

===== Manual addition =====
Closed circuit rebreathers usually allow the diver to add gas manually. In oxygen rebreathers this is just oxygen, but mixed gas rebreathers usually have a separate manual addition valve for oxygen and diluent, as either might be required to correct the composition of the loop mixture, either as the standard operating method for manually controlled CCRs, or as a backup system on electronically controlled CCRs. The manual diluent addition is sometimes by a purge button on the ADV.

===== Constant mass flow =====
Constant mass flow gas addition is used on active addition semi-closed rebreathers, where it is the normal method of addition at constant depth, and in many closed circuit rebreathers, where it is the primary method of oxygen addition, at a rate less than metabolically required by the diver at rest, and the rest is made up by the control system through a solenoid valve, or manually by the diver.

Constant mass flow is achieved by sonic flow through an orifice. The flow of a compressible fluid through an orifice is limited to the flow at sonic velocity in the orifice. This can be controlled by the upstream pressure and the orifice size and shape, but once the flow reached the speed of sound in the orifice, any further reduction of downstream pressure has no influence on the flow rate. This requires a gas source at a fixed pressure, and it only works at depths which have a low enough ambient pressure to provide sonic flow in the orifice.

Regulators which have their control components isolated from the ambient pressure are used to supply gas at a pressure independent of the depth.

===== Passive addition =====
In passive addition semi-closed rebreathers, gas is usually added by a demand type valve actuated by the bellows counterlung when the bellows is empty. This is the same actuation condition as the automatic diluent valve of any rebreather, but the actual trigger mechanism is slightly different. A passive addition rebreather of this type does not need a separate ADV as the passive addition valve already serves this function, though for engineering redundancy two such demand valves may be fitted, which operate simultaneously.

===== Electronically controlled (solenoid valves) =====
Electronically controlled closed circuit mixed gas rebreathers may have part of the oxygen feed provided by a constant mass flow orifice, but the fine control of partial pressure is done by solenoid operated valves actuated by the control circuits. Timed opening of the solenoid valve will be triggered when the oxygen partial pressure in the loop mix drops below the lower set-point.

If the constant mass flow orifice is compromised and does not deliver the correct flow, the control circuit will compensate by firing the solenoid valve more often.

==== Off-board gas ====
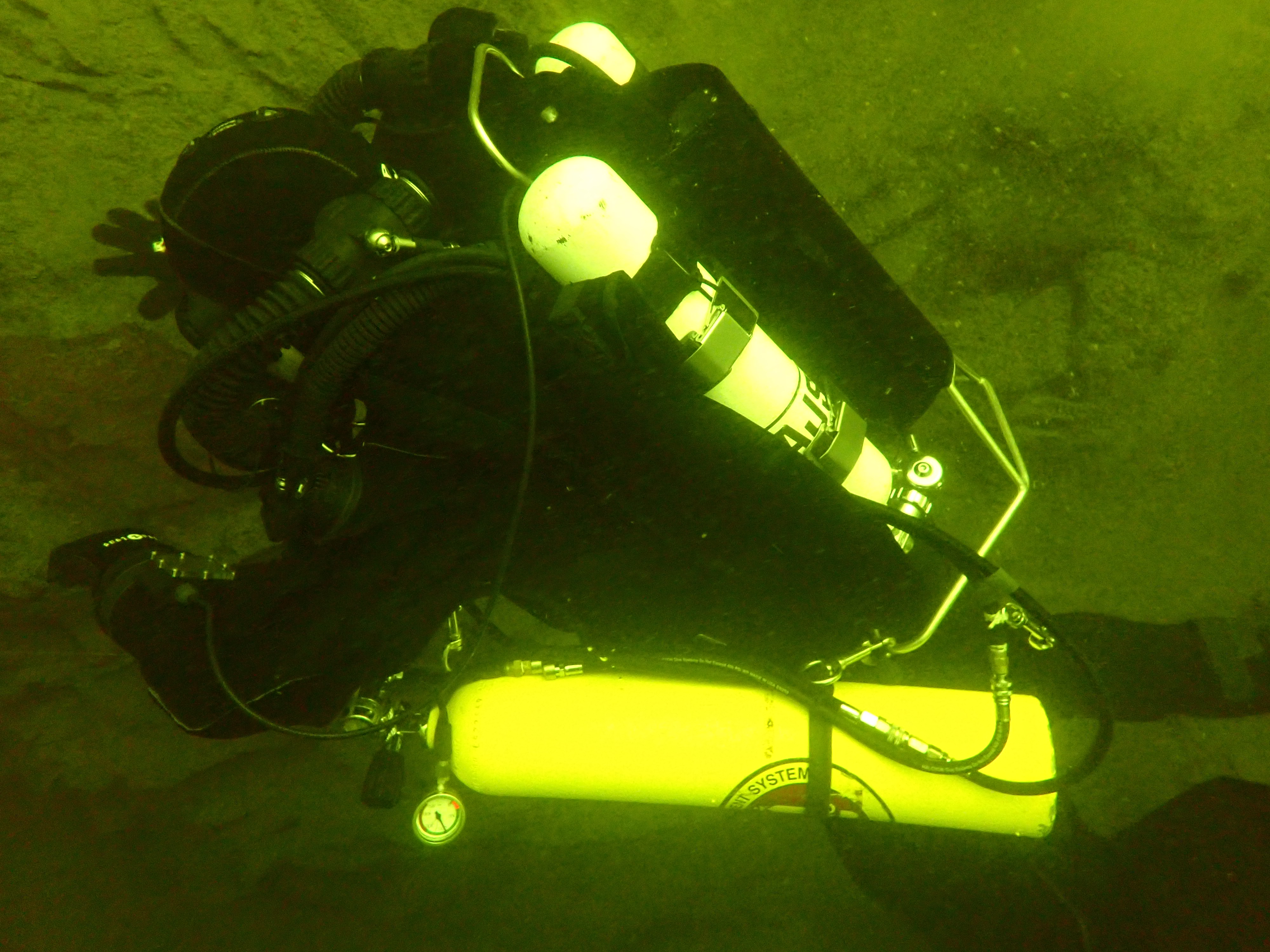
Off-board gas carried in a side mounted cylinder plumbed in to the rebreather bailout valve using wet-connectable couplers.

On some technical diving rebreathers it is possible to connect an alternative gas supply into the rebreather, usually using a wet quick-connect system. This is usually a feature of bailout rebreathers and other side-mounted rebreathers, where the rebreather unit is intentionally kept as compact as possible, and the gas supply may be slung on the other side of the diver for convenience and balance. This facility also allows all of the gas carried by a diver to be potentially supplied via a rebreather.

==== Bailout gas ====
Bailout gas and bailout procedure are closely linked. The procedure must be appropriate for the gas supply configuration. Initial bailout to open circuit is often the first step, even when a bailout rebreather is carried, as it is simple and robust, and some time is needed to get the bailout rebreather ready for use. Bailout gas supply must be sufficient for safe return to the surface from any point in the planned dive, including any required decompression, so it is not unusual for two bailout cylinders to be carried, and the diluent cylinder to be used as the first bailout to get to a depth where the other gas can be used. On a deep dive, or a long penetration, open circuit bailout can easily be heavier and more bulky than the rebreather, and for some dives a bailout rebreather is a more practical option.

=== Control of the breathing gas mix ===
Narked at 90 Ltd – Deep Pursuit Advanced electronic rebreather controller

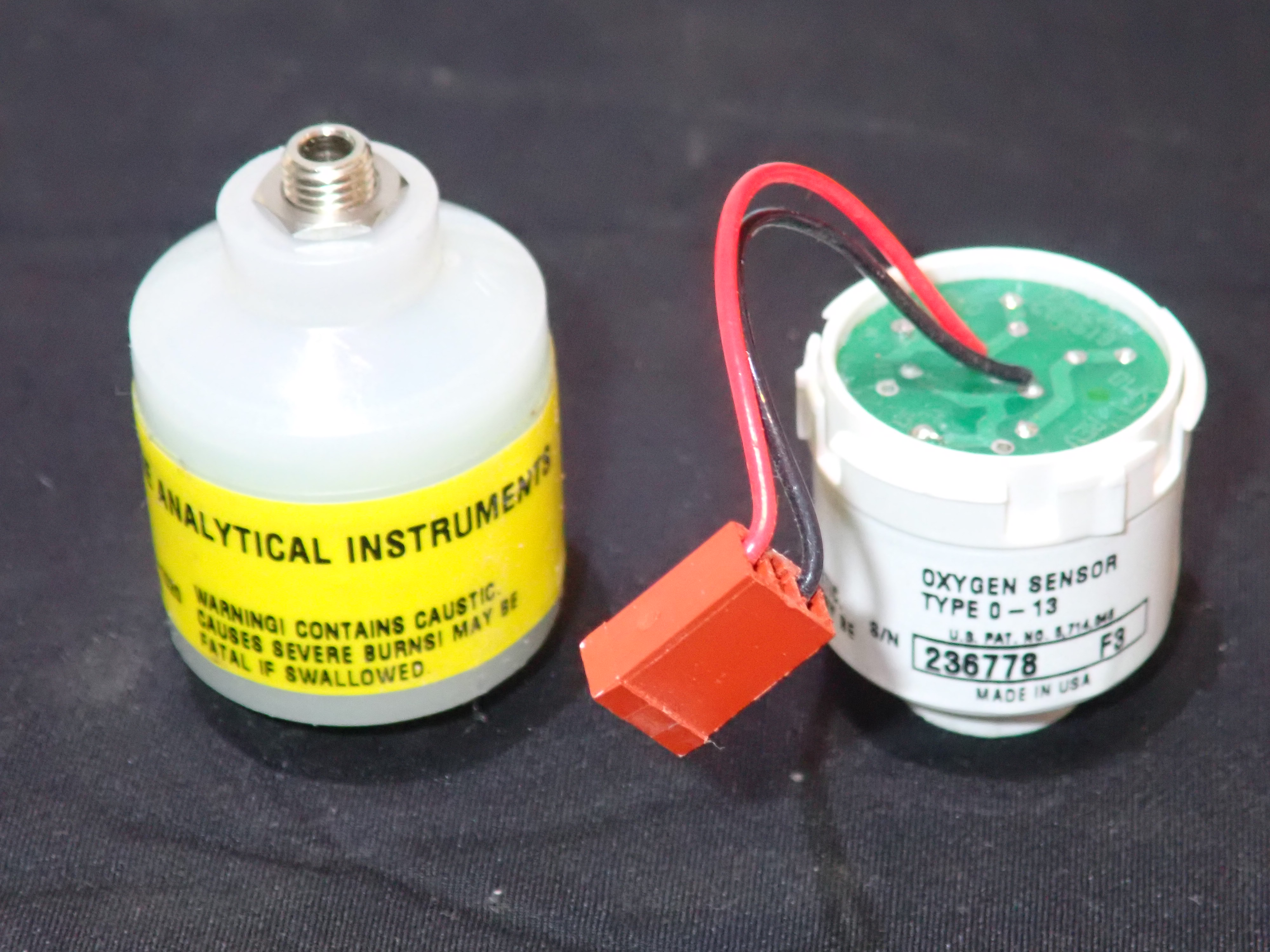
Oxygen sensor cells

The fundamental requirements for the control of the gas mixture in the breathing circuit for any rebreather application are that the carbon dioxide is removed, and kept at a tolerable level, and that the partial pressure of oxygen is kept within safe limits. For rebreathers which are used at normobaric or hypobaric pressures, this only requires that there is sufficient oxygen, which is easily achieved in an oxygen rebreather. Hyperbaric applications, as in diving, also require that the maximum partial pressure of oxygen is limited, to avoid oxygen toxicity, which is technically a more complex process, and may require dilution of the oxygen with metabolically inert gas.

If not enough oxygen is added, the concentration of oxygen in the loop may be too low to support life. In humans, the urge to breathe is normally caused by a build-up of carbon dioxide in the blood, rather than lack of oxygen. Hypoxia can cause blackout with little or no warning, followed by death.

The method used for controlling the range of oxygen partial pressure in the breathing loop depends on the type of rebreather.

- In an oxygen rebreather, once the loop has been thoroughly flushed, the mixture is effectively static at 100% oxygen, and the partial pressure is a function only of ambient pressure.
- In a semi-closed rebreather the loop mix depends on a combination of factors:

- the type of gas addition system and its setting, combined with the gas mixture in use, which control the rate of oxygen added.
- work rate, and therefore the oxygen consumption rate, which controls the rate of oxygen depletion, and therefore the resulting oxygen fraction.
- ambient pressure, as partial pressure varies in proportion to ambient pressure and oxygen fraction.

- In manually controlled closed circuit rebreathers (MCCCR), also known as diver-controlled closed-circuit rebreathers (DCCCR), the diver monitors the loop mix using one or more oxygen sensors, and controls the gas mixture and volume in the loop by injecting the appropriate available gases to the loop and by venting the loop. In this application the diver needs to know the partial pressure of oxygen in the loop and correct it as it drifts away from the set point. A common method for increasing the time between corrections is to use a constant mass flow orifice set to the diver's relaxed diving metabolic oxygen consumption rate to add oxygen at a rate that is unlikely to increase the partial pressure at a constant depth.
- Most electronically controlled closed-circuit rebreathers (ECCCR) have electro-galvanic oxygen sensors and electronic control circuits, which monitor the ppO_{2}, injecting more oxygen if necessary and issuing an audible, visual and/or vibratory warning to the diver if the ppO_{2} reaches dangerously high or low levels.

The volume in the loop is usually controlled by a pressure or volume triggered automatic diluent valve, and an overpressure relief valve. The automatic diluent valve works on the same principle as a demand valve to add diluent when the pressure in the loop is reduced below ambient pressure, such as during descent or if gas is lost from the loop. The set may also have a manual addition valve, sometimes called a bypass. In some early oxygen rebreathers the user had to manually open and close the valve to the oxygen cylinder to refill the counterlung each time the volume got low.

=== Rebreather control and monitor hardware ===
The functional requirements of an electronically controlled closed circuit rebreather are very similar to the functions and capacity of technical diving decompression computers for rebreather diving, and some rebreather manufacturers use dive computer hardware repackaged by dive computer manufacturers as rebreather control and monitoring units. The software may be modified to provide the display of multiple oxygen cell readings, warnings, alarms and voting logic, and the dive computer hardware may be hard-wired to the rebreather control hardware.

=== Communications protocols ===
The communications system used by Shearwater Research for connectivity between dive computers and rebreathers is DiveCAN, which has a physical connectivity standard and a communication protocol based on a recognised industry standard CAN bus.

=== Instrumentation and displays ===
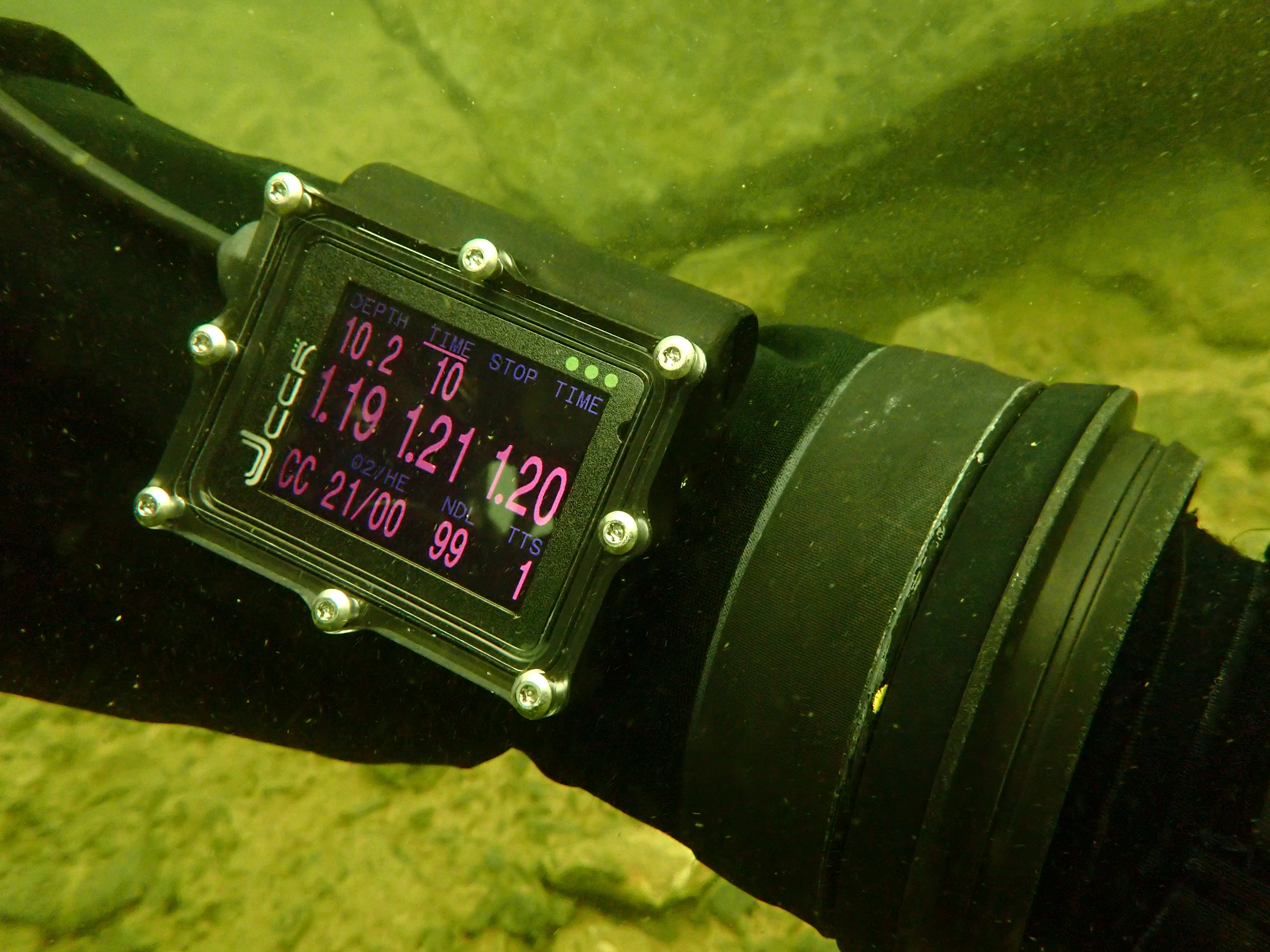
Integrated oxygen sensor displays on a dive computer showing oxygen partial pressure of three sensors in the centre row.

Instrumentation may vary from the minimal depth, time and remaining gas pressure necessary for a closed circuit oxygen rebreather or semi-closed nitrox rebreather to redundant electronic controllers with multiple oxygen sensors, redundant integrated decompression computers, carbon dioxide monitoring sensors and a head-up display of warning and alarm lights with a sound and vibration alarm.

==== Alarms for malfunctions ====
Alarms may be provided for a few malfunctions. The alarms are electronically controlled and may rely on input from a sensor and processing by the control circuitry. These may include:

- Failure of the control system.
- Failure of one or more sensors.
- Low partial pressure of oxygen in the loop.
- High partial pressure of oxygen in the loop.
- Gas other than pure oxygen in the oxygen supply system. (unusual)
- High carbon dioxide levels in the loop. (unusual)
- Impending scrubber breakthrough (unusual)

Alarm displays:

- Visible (digital screen displays, flashing LEDs)
- Audible (buzzer or tone generator)
- Tactile (Vibrations)
- Control panel displays (usually with digital readout of the value and status of the measured parameter, often with blinking or flashing display)
- Head-up displays (usually a colour coded LED display, sometimes providing more information by the rate of flashing.)

If a rebreather alarm goes off there is a high probability that the gas mixture is deviating from the set mixture. There is a high risk that the gas in the rebreather loop will soon be unsuitable to support consciousness. A good general response is to add diluent gas to the loop as this is known to be breathable. This will also reduce carbon dioxide concentration if that is high.

- Ascending while breathing off the loop without identifying the problem may increase risk of a hypoxia blackout.
- If the partial pressure of oxygen is not known the rebreather can not be trusted to be breathable, and the diver should immediately bailout to open circuit to reduce the risk of losing consciousness without warning

== Work of breathing ==
Work of breathing is the effort required to breathe. Part of the work of breathing is due to inherent physiological factors, part is due to the mechanics of the external breathing apparatus, and part is due to the characteristics of the breathing gas. A high work of breathing may result in carbon dioxide buildup in the diver, and reduces the diver's ability to produce useful physical effort. In extreme cases work of breathing may exceed the aerobic work capacity of the diver, with fatal consequences.

Work of breathing of a rebreather has two main components: Resistive work of breathing is due to the flow restriction of the gas passages causing resistance to flow of the breathing gas, and exists in all applications where there is no externally powered ventilation. Hydrostatic work of breathing is only applicable to diving applications, and is due to difference in pressure between the lungs of the diver and the counterlungs of the rebreather. This pressure difference is generally due to a difference in hydrostatic pressure caused by a difference in depth between lung and counterlung, but can be modified by ballasting the moving side of a bellows counterlung.

Resistive work of breathing is the sum of all the restrictions to flow due to bends, corrugations, changes of flow direction, valve cracking pressures, flow through scrubber media, etc., and the resistance to flow of the gas, due to inertia and viscosity, which are influenced by density, which is a function of molecular weight and pressure. Rebreather design can limit the mechanical aspects of flow resistance, particularly by the design of the scrubber, counterlungs and breathing hoses. Diving rebreathers are influenced by the variations of work of breathing due to gas mixture choice and depth. Helium content reduces work of breathing, and increased depth increases work of breathing. Work of breathing can also be increased by excessive wetness of the scrubber media, usually a consequence of a leak in the breathing loop, or by using a grain size of absorbent that is too small.

The semi-closed rebreather systems developed by Drägerwerk in the early 20th century as a scuba gas supply for Standard diving dress, using oxygen or nitrox, and the US Navy Mark V Heliox helmet developed in the 1930s for deep diving, circulated the breathing gas through the helmet and scrubber by using an injector system where the added gas entrained the loop gas and produced a stream of scrubbed gas past the diver inside the helmet, which eliminated external dead space and resistive work of breathing, but was not suitable for high breathing rates.

== Safety ==
There are safety issues specific to rebreather equipment, and these tend to be more severe in diving rebreathers. Methods of addressing these issues can be categorised as engineering and operational approaches. Development of engineering solutions to these issues is ongoing and has been relatively rapid, but depends on the affordable availability of suitable technology, and some of the engineering problems, such as reliability of oxygen partial pressure measurement, have been relatively intractable. Other problems, such as scrubber breakthrough monitoring and automated control of gas mixture have advanced considerably in the 21st century, but remain relatively expensive. Work of breathing is another issue that has room for improvement, and is a severe limitation on acceptable maximum depth of operation, as the circulation of gas through the scrubber is almost always powered by the lungs of the diver. Fault tolerant design can help with making failures survivable.

=== Hazards ===
Some of the hazards are due to the way the equipment works, while others are related to the environment in which the equipment is used.

==== Hypoxia ====
Hypoxia can occur in any rebreather which contains enough inert gas to allow breathing without triggering automatic gas addition.

In an oxygen rebreather this can occur if the loop is not sufficiently purged at the start of use. Purging should be done while breathing off the unit so that the inert gas from the user's lungs is also removed from the system.

==== Hyperoxia ====
A dangerously high partial pressure of oxygen can occur in the breathing loop for several reasons:

- Descent below the maximum operating depth with an oxygen rebreather or a semi-closed rebreather.
- Failure to correctly maintain the loop mixture within tolerance of the set point. This may be due to:
  - Oxygen sensor malfunction: If the cell fails current limited, it will register a partial pressure lower than reality, and the control system may attempt to correct by continuous injection of oxygen.
  - Voting logic error Where there are three of more oxygen cells, in the system, the voting logic will assume that the two with most similar outputs are correct. This may not be the case – there have been cases where two cells with almost identical history have failed in the same way at the same time, and the voting logic has dismissed the one remaining correctly functioning cell, with fatal consequences.
  - Power supply malfunction
  - Use of a diluent with too high oxygen fraction for the planned depth in a CCR. In this case a diluent flush will not produce a breathable gas in the loop.

==== Carbon dioxide buildup ====
Carbon dioxide buildup will occur if the scrubber medium is absent, badly packed, inadequate or exhausted. The normal human body is fairly sensitive to carbon dioxide partial pressure, and a buildup will be noticed by the user. However, there is not often much that can be done to rectify the problem except changing to another breathing gas supply until the scrubber can be repacked. Continued use of a rebreather with an ineffective scrubber is not possible for very long, as the levels will become toxic and the user will experience extreme respiratory distress, followed by loss of consciousness and death. The rate at which these problems develop depends on the volume of the circuit and the metabolic rate of the user.

==== Excessive work of breathing ====
Carbon dioxide buildup can also occur when a combination of exertion and work of breathing exceeds the capacity of the user. If this occurs where the user cannot reduce exertion sufficiently, it may be impossible to correct. In this case it is not the scrubber that fails to remove carbon dioxide, but the inability of the diver to circulate gas efficiently through the scrubber against the frictional resistance of the circuit causing the problem. This is more likely to occur with diving rebreathers at depths where the density of the breathing gas is severely elevated, or when water in the scrubber obstructs gas flow.

==== Fire hazards of high concentration of oxygen ====
High partial pressures of oxygen greatly increase fire hazard, and many materials which are self-extinguishing in atmospheric air will burn continuously in a high oxygen concentration. This is more of a risk for terrestrial applications such as rescue and firefighting than for diving, where the ignition risk is relatively low.

==== Caustic cocktail ====
Loop flooding that reaches the scrubber can cause a "caustic cocktail" when the alkaline components of carbon dioxide absorbent materials are mixed with the water. This mixture is caustic and can cause chemical burns to the mucosa and skin. The mixture is generally a liquid or watery slurry with a chalky and bitter taste, which should prompt the diver to switch to an alternative source of breathing gas and immediately rinse their mouth out well with water. Some modern diving rebreather absorbents are designed not to produce "caustic cocktail" if they get wet.

=== Failure modes ===
Diving rebreathers are susceptible to some failure modes which cannot occur in other breathing apparatus.

==== Scrubber failure ====
The term "breakthrough" means the failure of the scrubber to continue removing sufficient carbon dioxide from the gas circulating in the loop. This will inevitably happen if the scrubber is used too long, but can happen prematurely in some circumstances. There are several ways that the scrubber may fail or become less efficient:

- Complete consumption of the active ingredient in a "general breakthrough". Depending on scrubber design and diver workload, this may be gradual, allowing the diver to become aware of the problem in time to make a controlled bailout to open circuit, or relatively sudden, triggering an urgent or emergency response.
- Bypassing the absorbent. The absorbent granules must be packed closely so that all exhaled gas comes into contact with the surface of soda lime and the canister is designed to avoid any spaces or gaps between the absorbent granules or between the granules and the canister walls that would let gas bypass contact with the absorbent. If any of the seals, such as O-rings, or spacers that prevent bypassing of the scrubber, are not present or not fitted properly, or if the scrubber canister has been incorrectly packed or fitted, it may allow the exhaled gas to bypass the absorbent, and the scrubber will be less effective. This failure mode is also called "tunneling" when absorbent settles to form void spaces inside the canister. Bypass will cause an unexpected early breakthrough.
- When the gas mix is under pressure at depth, the gas molecules are more densely packed, and the carbon dioxide molecules' mean path between collisions is shorter, so they are not so free to move around to reach the absorbent surface, and require a longer dwell time. Because of this effect, the scrubber must be bigger for deep diving than is needed for a shallow-water, industrial or high altitude rebreather.
- Carbon dioxide absorbent when mixed with water from a leak, can produce a caustic cocktail. The excessive wetting of the sorb also reduces the rate of carbon dioxide removal and can cause premature breakthrough even if no caustic liquid reaches the diver. Work of breathing may also increase. Many modern diving rebreather absorbents are designed not to produce this caustic fluid if they get wet.
- In below-freezing surface conditions while preparing for diving, wet scrubber chemicals can freeze while there is a pause in the exothermic reaction of taking up the carbon dioxide, thus preventing carbon dioxide from reaching the scrubber material, and slowing the reaction when used again.

==== Flooding of the loop ====
Flooding of the breathing loop can occur due to a leak at a low point in the loop where internal gas pressure is less than the external water pressure. One of the more common ways this can happen is if the mouthpiece is dislodged or removed from the diver's mouth without first closing the dive/surface valve or switching to bailout. This can happen due to accidental impact or through momentary inattention. Depending on the layout of the loop and the attitude of the rebreather in the water, the amount of water ingress can vary, as can the distance it travels into the air passages of the breathing loop. In some models of rebreather a moderate amount of water will be trapped at a low point in a counterlung or the scrubber housing, and prevented from reaching the absorbent in the scrubber. Some rebreathers have a system to expel water trapped in this way, either automatically through the vent valve, such as in the Halcyon RB80 and the Interspiro DCSC, or manually by using a small pump.

==== Gas leakage ====
There are several places on a rebreather where gas leakage can cause problems. Leakage can occur from the high and intermediate pressure components, and from the loop, at pressure slightly above ambient. The effects on system integrity depend on severity of the leak. If only small volumes of gas are lost the leak may be tolerable for the rest of the dive, but a leak may become more severe, depending on the cause, and may in some cases deteriorate catastrophically.

==== Oxygen monitoring failure ====
- Failure of electro-galvanic oxygen sensors.
- Failure of voting logic
- Failure of display

Oxygen monitoring failure can lead to incorrect partial pressure of oxygen in the breathing gas. The consequences can include hypoxia, hyperoxia, and incorrect decompression information, all three of which are potentially life-threatening.

==== Gas injection system failure ====
- Constant mass flow orifice blockage:– In a CCR, blockage of a CMF oxygen injection orifice will increase the frequency of manual or solenoid valve injection, which is an inconvenience rather than an emergency. In active addition SCRs the unnoticed failure of gas injection will lead to the mix becoming hypoxic. If there is instrumentation monitoring the partial pressure of oxygen in the loop, the diver can compensate by manual injection or forcing automatic injection via the ADV by dumping gas into the environment by exhaling through the nose.
- Injector control circuit malfunction:– If the control circuit for oxygen injection fails, the usual mode of failure results in the oxygen injection valves being closed. Unless action is taken, the breathing gas will become hypoxic with potentially fatal consequences. An alternative mode of failure is one in which the injection valves are kept open, resulting in an increasingly hyperoxic gas mix in the loop, which may pose the danger of oxygen toxicity. Two basic approaches for preventing loss of availability are possible. Either a redundant independent control system may be used, or the risk of the single system failing may be accepted, and the diver takes the responsibility for manual gas mixture control in the event of failure. Both methods depend on continued reliable oxygen monitoring. Most (possibly all) electronically controlled CCRs have manual injection override. If the electronic injection fails, the user can take manual control of the gas mixture provided that the oxygen monitoring is still reliably functioning. Alarms are usually provided to warn the diver of failure.
- Automatic diluent valve malfunction:– The ADV is the same technology as an open circuit demand valve, and as such is generally very reliable if maintained correctly. Two failure modes are possible, Free flow, where the valve sticks open, and the less likely failure of the valve to open. As diluent is usually chosen to be breathable at all or most depths of the planned dive, this is not usually immediately dangerous, but a free flow will use up the diluent rapidly and unless rectified soon the diver will have to abort the dive and bail out. There may be a manual diluent valve which the diver can use to add gas if the valve fails closed.

=== Scrubber monitoring ===
The methods available for monitoring the condition of the scrubber and predicting and identifying imminent breakthrough include:

- Dive planning and scheduled replacement. Divers are trained to monitor and plan the exposure time of the absorbent material in the scrubber and replace it within the recommended time limit. This method is necessarily very conservative, as actual carbon dioxide produced during a dive is not accurately predictable and is not measured. Manufacturers recommendations for replacement periods tend to allow for worst cases to reduce risk, and this is relatively uneconomical in absorbent usage.
- An indicator dye that changes colour when the active ingredient is consumed may be included in the absorbent. For example, a rebreather absorbent called "Protosorb" supplied by Siebe Gorman had a red indicator dye, which was said to go white when the absorbent was exhausted. With a transparent canister, this may show the position of the reaction front. This is useful where the canister is visible to the user, which is seldom possible on diving equipment, where the canister is often inside the counterlung or a back mounted casing. Colour indicating dye was removed from US Navy fleet use in 1996 when it was suspected of releasing chemicals into the circuit.
- Temperature monitoring. As the reaction between carbon dioxide and soda lime is exothermic, temperature sensors along the length of the scrubber can be used to measure the position of the reaction front and therefore the estimated remaining life of the scrubber.
- While carbon dioxide gas sensors exist, they are not useful as a tool for predicting remaining scrubber endurance as they measure the carbon dioxide in the scrubbed gas, and the onset of scrubber break through generally occurs quite rapidly. Such systems are fitted as a safety device to warn divers to bail off the loop immediately.

=== Fault tolerant design ===
Fault tolerance is the property that enables a system to continue operating properly in the event of the failure of some of its components. If its operating quality decreases at all, the decrease is proportional to the severity of the failure, as compared to a naively designed system, in which even a small failure can cause total breakdown. Fault tolerance is particularly important in high availability or safety-critical systems. The ability to maintain functionality when portions of a system break down is referred to as graceful degradation.

The basic closed circuit oxygen rebreather is a very simple and mechanically reliable device, but it has severe operational limitations due to oxygen toxicity. The approaches to safely extending the depth range necessitate a variable breathing gas mixture. Semi-closed rebreathers tend to be inefficient for decompression, and not entirely predictable for gas composition in comparison with a precisely controlled closed circuit rebreather. Monitoring the gas composition in the breathing loop can only be done by electrical sensors, bringing the underwater reliability of the electronic sensing system into the safety critical component category.

There are no formal statistics on underwater electronics failure rates, but it is likely that human error is more frequent than the error rate of electronic dive computers, which are the basic component of rebreather control electronics, which process information from multiple sources and have an algorithm for controlling the oxygen injection solenoid. The sealed dive computer package has been around for long enough for the better quality models to have become reliable and robust in design and construction.

An electronically controlled rebreather is a complex system. The control unit receives input from several sensors, evaluates the data, calculates the appropriate next action or actions, updates the system status and displays, and performs the actions, in some cases using real-time feedback to adapt the control signal. The inputs include signals from one or more of pressure, oxygen and temperature sensors, a clock, and possibly helium and carbon dioxide sensors. There is also a battery power source, and a user interface in the form of a visual display, user input interface in the form of button switches, and possibly audio and vibratory alarms.

In a minimal eCCR the system is very vulnerable. A single critical fault can necessitate manual procedures for fault recovery or the need to bail out to an alternative breathing gas supply. Some faults may have fatal consequences if not noticed and managed very quickly. Critical failures include power supply, non-redundant oxygen sensor, solenoid valves or control unit.

The purely mechanical components are relatively robust and reliable and tend to degrade non-catastrophically, and are bulky and heavy, so the electronic sensors and control systems have been the components where improved fault tolerance has generally been sought. Oxygen cell failures have been a particular problem, with predictably serious consequences, so the use of multiple redundancy in oxygen partial pressure monitoring has been an important area of development for improving reliability. A problem in this regard is the cost and relatively short lifespan of oxygen sensors, along with their relatively unpredictable time to failure, and sensitivity to the environment.

To automatically detect and identify oxygen sensor malfunction, either the sensors must be calibrated with a known gas, which is very inconvenient at most times during a dive, but is possible as an occasional test when a fault is suspected, or several cells can be compared and the assumption made that cells with near identical output are functioning correctly. This voting logic requires a minimum of three cells, and reliability increases with number. To combine cell redundancy with monitoring circuit, control circuit and display redundancy, the cell signals should all be available to all monitoring and control circuits in normal conditions. This can be done by sharing signals at the analog or digital stage – the cell output voltage can be supplied to the input of all monitoring units, or the voltages of some cells can be supplied to each monitor, and the processed digital signals shared. The sharing of digital signals may allow easier isolation of defective components if short circuits occur. The minimum number of cells in this architecture is two per monitoring unit, with two monitoring units for redundancy, which is more than the minimum three for basic voting logic capability.

The three aspects of a fault tolerant rebreather are hardware redundancy, robust software and a fault detection system. The software is complex and comprises several modules with their own tasks, such as oxygen partial pressure measurement, ambient pressure measurement, Oxygen injection control, decompression status calculation and the user interface of status and information display and user inputs. It is possible to separate the user interface hardware from the control and monitoring unit, in a way that allows the control system to continue to operate if the relatively vulnerable user interface is compromised.

Characteristics that would improve safety include:

- Full automation of the control system would avoid a range of user errors, provided the control system is reliable and fault tolerant.
- A highly reliable oxygen sensor system would reduce the risk of hypoxia or hyperoxic breathing gas.
- An oxygen sensor system that can reliably detect sensor failures and identify the failure mode.
- Carbon dioxide sensors that can reliably detect the beginning of a scrubber failure.
- Low work of breathing.

=== Manufacturing and operation standards ===
Diving rebreathers must comply with EN 14143: Respiratory equipment - Self-contained re-breathing diving apparatus to be legally manufactured of marketed in the European Union. European Standard EN 14143 specifies performance requirements intended to ensure safe operation of a diving rebreather. Maximum depths are specified at 6m for oxygen rebreathers, 40m for nitrox rebreathers and 100m for rebreathers using helium based breathing gases. Water temperature range is from 4 °C to 34 °C unless the manufacturer specifies a wider range.

Diving rebreathers fall under the European Personal Protective Equipment Directive, which requires certification of product quality assurance and tested product performance by a neutral accredited third party. This is a costly and time consuming process, which can inhibit innovation, but is also recognised as an important influence on product safety and manufacturer liability limitation.

== Operation ==
Rebreathers are more complex to use than open circuit scuba, and have more potential points of failure, so acceptably safe use requires a greater level of skill, attention and situational awareness, which is usually derived from understanding the systems, diligent maintenance and overlearning the practical skills of operation and fault recovery. Fault tolerant design can make a rebreather less likely to fail in a way that immediately endangers the user, and reduces the task loading on the diver which in turn may lower the risk of operator error.

== Technological innovations ==
Rebreather technology has advanced considerably, often driven by the growing market in recreational diving equipment, particularly in underwater cave exploration. Innovations include:

- Bailout valves – a device in the mouthpiece of the loop which connects to a bailout demand valve and can be switched to provide gas from either the loop or the demand valve without the diver taking the mouthpiece from their mouth. An important safety device when carbon dioxide poisoning occurs.
- Closed circuit bailout.
- Active and passive oxygen sensor validation.
- Hyperoxic linearity test.
- Integrated decompression computers – input to a dive computer from the oxygen sensors of the rebreather allow divers to take advantage of the actual partial pressure of oxygen to generate an optimised schedule for decompression.
- Gas integrated decompression computers – these allow divers to take advantage of the actual gas mixture, as measured by one or more oxygen cells in real time, to generate a schedule for decompression in real time.
- Carbon dioxide scrubber life monitoring systems – temperature sensors monitor the progress of the reaction of the soda lime and provide an indication of when the scrubber will be exhausted.
- Carbon dioxide level monitoring systems – Gas sensing cell and interpretive electronics which detect the concentration of carbon dioxide in the rebreather loop downstream from the scrubber.
- Multiple set-points automatically selected by depth – Electronic rebreather control systems can be programmed to change set-point above and below selectable limiting depths to limit oxygen exposure during the working dive, but increase the limit during decompression above the limiting depth to accelerate decompression.
- Automated pre-dive checklists and systems checks.
- Head-up displays for status and alarms.
- Data logging.
- Sidemount rebreathers

=== Active and passive oxygen sensor validation ===
Accurate and reliable oxygen partial pressure measurement is one of the most problematic factors in rebreather diving safety. Control systems using this data have developed to the extent that they are robust and reliable, and the use of an independent backup improves the reliability to about as good as for any other component. The weakest point is the sensors, which are prone to several modes of failure, some of which are relatively insidious as the cell may pass a normobaric calibration and fail when the partial pressure is near the high end of the acceptable working range, which is also the range in which constant partial pressure diving has the maximum benefit. When it has been possible to infer the cause, the leading cause of rebreather fatalities is hypoxia, at approximately 17%, with hyperoxia assumed in an additional 4% of cases. If these trends extend into the range of indeterminate cases, it is possible that inappropriate oxygen content is involved in 30% of rebreather fatalities.

The standard method for improving reliability of oxygen monitoring has been multiple redundancy – the use of 3 or more sensors – and using the multiple data inputs with a voting logic system to try to identify failure of a sensor in time to make a controlled and safe termination of the dive. Voting logic normally assumes that if one sensor produces a reading significantly differing from two or more others when exposed to the same environment, the outlier is faulty, and the input of the others is assumed accurate. Unfortunately this is not always the case, and there have been cases where the outlier sensor was most correct. It has been shown that the reliability of this system is lower than originally expected due to a lack of sufficient statistical independence of the three sensors, and that outcomes are not symmetrical – the effects of faulty low or high partial pressure readings are also depth dependent.

If a sensor gives relatively static output with little response to variations in depth and temperature, and changes in gas composition due to use, gas addition, incomplete mixing or loop turbulence, it is likely that the sensor may not be responding correctly, and when two sensors follow a similar pattern of response this is a warning that both may be defective. Algorithms that track sensor output against expected output taking known changes into account can indicate reliability of the sensors. This method of monitoring sensors is known as passive sensor validation (PSV), can be used to improve reliability of sensor integrity assessment, and can be used in the control system to make more reliable decisions on which sensors are most likely to be giving trustworthy output in comparison with voting logic based only on calibration values for the sensors. PSV is an improvement on simple voting logic but is still susceptible to errors related to statistical independence of components.

Early work on design of an automatic sensor validation system, in which the rebreather control system would periodically inject gas of known composition onto the oxygen sensors during the dive and use the output to determine the viability of the sensor response with greater precision and accuracy than a human diver, was started in 2002, and further developed to be used on the Poseidon/Cis-Lunar MK-VI rebreather. This "Active Sensor Validation" (ASV) system has been refined over thousands of hours of field test diving in varied conditions

The ASV system has become more sophisticated than the manual implementation in the Cis-Lunar MK-5P. It involves more than comparing the measured PO_{2} value from the sensor with the calculated PO_{2} of the diluent at the current depth. In the implementation in the Poseidon rebreathers the computer automatically injects either diluent or oxygen directly onto a single primary oxygen sensor every five minutes during a dive. The algorithm takes into account current depth, FO_{2} of the injected gas, ambient temperature, duration of gas injection, and calibration values for the sensor for that dive to predict how the sensor should respond over the next few seconds after each gas injection, and compares that with the measured results to produce a confidence level for correct sensor performance.

This type of sensor validation test can identify several modes of failure by the ways the measured values deviate from expected values with variations of calculated partial pressure of the test gas, and is capable of detecting failures due to incorrect temperature readings, incorrect input of the FO_{2} of the diluent condensation on the oxygen sensor, a defective oxygen sensor, validation gas supply failure and other reasons that would not be detected by voting logic.

=== Hyperoxic linearity test ===
The oxygen sensors for most rebreathers are calibrated at the surface before the dive using air or 100% oxygen at normal atmospheric pressure. These are reliable calibration points but the range of operational partial pressures may extend beyond these calibration points, and if the sensors are calibrated for a linear response between these conditions and the response is extrapolated, for set points above 1 bar, which is standard practice, the control system must operate outside of the range for which response is known to be linear. One of the most common modes of failure is for a cell to become current-limited as it ages. The internal impedance changes as the anode is consumed by the reaction which produces the output current, and the response becomes non-linear at higher oxygen partial pressures. The signal may indicate a lower partial pressure and does not increase proportionately as oxygen is added, leading to a loop oxygen partial pressure that may increase to dangerous levels without warning. A way of validating the sensors at high partial pressures is to expose the sensor to higher PO_{2} than the upper set point by exposing it to pure oxygen at a depth of 6 m, for a PO_{2} of 1.6 bar during the dive, or at 1.6 bar or more in a calibration pressure pot. Both these methods are cumbersome and the in-water method may cause spiking of the PO_{2} during descent. A variation of the ASV system using oxygen, called a hyperoxic linearity test (HLT), uses oxygen as the flushing gas at 6 m, which can check that the sensor is linear to 1.6 bar PO_{2}, and if it fails, the set point can be automatically reduced to within the linear range established during calibration. A single sensor with PSV and ASV has been shown to be more reliable than three sensors with conventional voting logic. The effectiveness of cell validation algorithms is expected to improve with the acquisition of more field data gathered by the rebreather control systems.

=== Carbon dioxide monitoring ===
Hypercapnia has been identified as one of the most prevalent factors in rebreather diving fatalities. This is generally a consequence of scrubber failure to remove carbon dioxide as fast as it is produced, which may be caused by any one or a combination of spent, wet, or inadequately packed, absorbent material, incorrectly designed or assembled canisters, mismatch of absorbent and canister design, or absorbent used beyond its operational range. Higher carbon dioxide partial pressure in the loop leads to higher levels of carbon dioxide in the blood and tissue, which can have a range of symptoms including respiratory distress, increased susceptibility to CNS oxygen toxicity, disorientation, and loss of consciousness.

Most rebreather designs have relied on very conservative time-based limits for absorbent duration based on experimental testing, using cold conditions and high workloads and high depth pressures. The usually unnecessarily high conservatism encourages divers to stretch the absorbent duration, which works well enough until it doesn't, often without warning, which can have serious consequences. A more sophisticated method is to base absorbent duration limits on metabolic oxygen consumption, as a proxy for metabolic carbon dioxide production, which is reasonably stable for most people most of the time, and can compensate fairly well for variations in exertion and base metabolism, but does not compensate reliably for depth and pressure effects on absorbent function.

A more direct and empirical approach is to take advantage of the production of heat and rise in temperature of the active zone of the absorbent in the scrubber. More carbon dioxide is absorbed by the first zone of relatively unused absorbent that it reaches as the breathing gas passes through the scrubber, and this relatively active zone progresses through the canister as the zone first reached by the gas is exhausted, and more reaction occurs further along. This reaction front is at a higher temperature than the spent absorbent, and the absorbent not yet exposed to high carbon dioxide levels, and the front progresses along the scrubber until part of it reaches the end of the absorbent, and unscrubbed gas breaks through to the other side of the loop, after which there is a fairly constant and irreversible increase in inspired carbon dioxide. Some rebreather manufacturers have developed linear temperature probes which identify the position of the reactive front, allowing the user to estimate the remaining duration of the canister.

None of these methods can detect canister bypass and they have little ability to identify completely spent absorbent, channeling, badly packed, or inappropriate absorbent material, but this can be done by a direct measurement of carbon dioxide partial pressure in the inhalation side of the loop.

Research and development of carbon dioxide sensors goes back at least as far as the early 1990s when Teledyne Analytical Instruments and Cis-Lunar Development Laboratories worked on a sensor for the Cis-Lunar MK-III rebreather, which was accurate in laboratory conditions but in the field susceptible to high humidity and condensation causing unreliable readings, which was a recurring problem with real-time carbon dioxide measurement. High pressures also caused problems for depth compensation. In 2009 VR Technologies released a commercial CO_{2} sensor using hydrophobic membranes to keep the sensors dry without excessively reducing gas flow to the sensors.

Since then other manufacturers have introduced their products to the market but they have not gained widespread use. They are relatively expensive, give unreliable readings in some circumstances, can only detect failure of the scrubber, and do not predict remaining duration. A combination of temperature measurement and post scrubber CO_{2} measurement can give both prediction and failure warning, for increased cost and complexity.

Placement of the sensor in the loop can affect sensitivity to actual CO_{2} content of inspired gas. Measuring gas in the mouthpiece has problems due to dead space, and mounting in the inhalation hose near the mouthpiece makes the sensor sensitive to small leaks in the inhalation check valve, while also able to detect high CO_{2} due to major check valve leaks which would cause a big increase in dead space, which would not be detected if the sensor is further upstream in the loop.

Furthermore, increased levels of CO_{2} in inspired gas is only one cause of hypercapnia. It is also affected by work of breathing, diver fitness, respiratory ventilation patterns, and other behavioural, physiological, and mechanical factors. A better option would be to measure both inhaled and exhaled CO_{2} levels, and this would require sensors that are fast and reliable in wet conditions, and reasonably inexpensive

=== Automated pre-dive checklists ===
Following the strong endorsement by Rebreather Forum 3 of the use of written checklists to improve safety, Cis-Lunar Development Laboratories programmed an electronic pre-dive checklist into their MK-5P rebreather operating system, as a way to prevent the user from neglecting to carry out the recommended checks before use. This was considered successful and implemented on later generations in the Poseidon MK-VI and SE7EN rebreathers, and developed to include robust internal diagnostics for the core electronic components and software, and automatic calibration of the oxygen sensor cells at normobaric pressures. Failure to complete the full checklist results in a range of alarms if the user attempts to dive with the unit. While not entirely foolproof – Oxygen cells are not calibrated at hyperbaric working pressures – a number of safety critical errors will be picked up and the diver made aware of them. The software also logs the steps and data from the pre-dive check and this has been valuable for accident analysis. The pre-dive checks also take less time and require no paper or user logging effort. This system has been shown to reduce risk and has been adopted by several manufacturers.

=== Head-up displays ===
The user interface of the rebreather control system is where information is exchanged between the diver and the electronic control system, and is an area with several possibilities for errors, both of user input and data interpretation, some of which could have serious or fatal consequences. The intrinsically higher risk of mechanical failure due to high complexity can be compensated by engineering redundancy, both of the control system and bailout gas supply, and appropriate training. The design of the human–machine interface (HMI) can be improved to reduce the risk of misunderstanding and error, and training can focus on correct interpretation of the information and appropriate response. The HMI usually has two main components, displays and alarms, and many of the alarms are associated with specific visual information.

A challenge of designing effective alarms is to ensure that the diver is not distracted by irrelevant information and that they are not triggered too easily, which habituates the diver to paying less attention, and while possibly fulfilling legal requirements regarding warnings and alarms, may make the equipment functionally less safe to use. One strategy to avoid this problem is to target different senses – auditory, visual and tactile – sometimes based on a vibratory output to the mouthpiece.

An effective display ensures that the user gets the information they need when they need it, and the information they want when they want it, in a form that is immediately recognised and unambiguously understood. When too much information is presented at a time of stress, the user may be confused or unable to distinguish the useful information in time to use it effectively. At other times more detailed information may be useful or necessary to make a correct decision. Multiple displays, or multiple views on the same display can help with this.

A trend in rebreather displays that is predicted to become more widespread, is the use of advanced head-up displays, which can provide a wider range of information by using an array of coloured lights or more complex graphical or alphanumeric displays that remain peripherally visible to the diver at all times, and only require eye movement to become fully readable.

=== Closed circuit bailout ===
A major logistical problem for long and deep rebreather dives is the volume of bailout equipment that must be carried to allow a safe return to the surface from any point of the dive after irrecoverable failure of the primary system. The open circuit option can become extremely bulky and awkward to manage, and while more compact and efficient, the rebreather option has its own set of logistic challenges.

One of the main design challenges in developing a closed circuit bailout system for rebreathers is to maintain the bailout set in a condition ready for use at all depths. This implies breathable gas for the depth, though not necessarily optimised, as the mix can be brought to set point quite rabidly after bailout, and a gas volume that does not vary excessively, so that buoyancy control is not unduly complicated. The bulk of the system must be manageable, and the bailout set mouthpiece must be easily accessible, but secure. Since bailout rebreathers are most likely to be used on dives with large decompression obligations, the switch to bailout must be accommodated by the decompression management system. If real-time monitoring of oxygen partial pressure is included in decompression computation, it must be possible to transfer this facility between units, without compromising their independence. Task-loading of the diver in managing the two loops must not be excessive, as the diver is recognised as the least reliable aspect of the operation, and may be under significant stress when bailout becomes necessary.

=== Data logging ===
Data logged from rebreather dives is useful for accident analysis, testing and development of rebreathers, and for diver educational purposes. Dive profile logging by integrated decompression computers is also of value for research into effectiveness of decompression schedules. Aggregation of such data can provide insights into diving patterns across the population of users and help in analysing risk.

The control systems of electronic rebreathers have continued to increase in processing and storage capacity, and in parallel, their capacity for capturing data at increased granularity and precision has increased. In 1994 the Cis-Lunar Mk-IV data logging system recorded data at several hundred points per hour of dive time, and by 1997 the Cis-Lunar Mk-5P was logging over a thousand points per hour. By 2007 the Poseidon MK-VI Discovery was logging between 15,000 and 25,000 points per hour, and in 2016 the Poseidon SE7EN recorded more than double that quantity, in alignment with the recommendations of Rebreather Forum 3, which states:

The forum recommends that all rebreathers incorporate data-logging systems that record functional parameters relevant to the particular unit and dive data and that allow download of these data. Diagnostic reconstruction of dives with as many relevant parameters as possible is the goal of this initiative. An ideal goal would be to incorporate redundancy in data-logging systems and, as much as practical, to standardize the data to be collected

Some of the logged data is specific to the rebreather model, and is not appropriate for general analysis, but some data is useful for external analysis of user population and diving practices which could improve understanding of behaviour and safety analysis.

== Manufacturers and models ==
=== Oxygen rebreather manufacturers ===
- Aqua Lung/La Spirotechnique – French company manufacturing breathing apparatus and diving equipment
  - FROGS (Full Range Oxygen Gas System) – Closed circuit oxygen diving rebreather – a model of closed circuit oxygen rebreather for intensive shallow water work and clandestine special forces operations made by AquaLung, which has been used in France since October 2002. The unit can be worn on the chest, or with an adaptor frame, on the back. The scrubber has an endurance of about 4 hours at 4 °C and respiratory minute volume of 40 litres per minute, and a 2.1 litre 207 bar cylinder. It is manufactured in non-magnetic and magnetic versions and can use either 2.6 kg of granular sorb or a moulded carbon dioxide absorbent insert.
- Dräger – German manufacturer of breathing equipment
  - LAR-5 – Military oxygen tebreather by Drägerwerk
  - LAR-6 – Military oxygen rebreather by Drägerwerk
  - LAR-V – Military oxygen rebreather by Drägerwerk
- Lambertsen Amphibious Respiratory Unit – Early closed circuit oxygen diving rebreather
- Porpoise – Australian scuba manufacturer
  - Porpoise (rebreather) – Australian oxygen rebreather – Ted Eldred's oxygen rebreather.
- Siebe Gorman – British manufacturer of diving equipment and salvage contractor
  - Mark IV Amphibian – British military oxygen rebreather
  - CDBA – Type of diving rebreather used by the Royal Navy
  - Davis Submerged Escape Apparatus – Oxygen rebreather – One of the first rebreathers to be produced in quantity.
  - Salvus – Industrial rescue and shallow water oxygen rebreather
  - The "Universal" rebreather was a long-dive derivative of the Davis Submerged Escape Apparatus, intended to be used with the Sladen Suit.
- IDA71 – Russian military rebreather for underwater and high altitude use
- SDBA – Special duty oxygen breathing apparatus, a military rebreather – A type of frogman's oxygen rebreather. It has a nitrox variant called ONBA.

=== Mixed gas rebreather manufacturers ===
- AP Diving – British manufacturer of underwater diving equipment
  - Inspiration series – one of the first electronic closed circuit rebreathers to be mass produced for the recreational market.
- Aqua Lung/La Spirotechnique – French company manufacturing breathing apparatus and diving equipment
  - DC55
- BioMarine – American manufacturer of diving rebreathers
  - BioMarine CCR 1000
  - BioMarine Mk-15 military rebreather
  - BioMarine Mk-16 military rebreather
- Carleton Life Support – Subsidiary of Cobham based in Davenport, Iowa
  - Siva – Range of military rebreathers military rebreather, and
  - Viper – Electronically-controlled closed circuit mixed gas military rebreather
  - Viper E – made by Carleton and Juergensen Defense Corporation
  - Carleton CDBA – Military rebreather by Cobham plc – Clearance Diver's Breathing Apparatus.
- Cis-Lunar – Manufacturer of electronically controlled closed-circuit rebreathers for scuba diving
- Divex – Scottish provider of diving equipment and related services
  - Clearance Divers' Life Support Equipment (CDLSE) – An electronic closed circuit rebreather allowing diving to 60 metres (200 ft).
- Dräger – German manufacturer of breathing equipment
  - Dräger Dolphin – Semi-closed circuit recreational diving rebreather
  - Dräger Ray – Semi-closed circuit diving rebreather
- Halcyon Dive Systems – American manufacturer of diving equipment
  - Halcyon PVR-BASC – Semi-closed circuit depth compensated passive addition diving rebreather
  - Halcyon RB80 – Non-depth-compensated passive addition semi-closed circuit rebreather
  - Halcyon Symbios chest mount eCCR
- IDA71 – Russian military rebreather for underwater and high altitude use
- Interspiro DCSC – Military semi-closed circuit passive addition diving rebreather
- Jetsam Technologies – Manufacturer of manual closed circuit rebreathers – Manufacturer of KISS brand rebreathers
  - KISS – Manufacturer of recreational/technical mixed gas rebreathers – line of manually operated closed circuit rebreathers originally designed by Gordon Smith . and manufactured by Jetsam Technologies, which was later acquired by Darkwater Group (XDEEP and SEAL Drysuits)
    - KISS Classic – Back mount manually controlled closed circuit rebreather – Back mount mCCR
    - Kiss Spirit – Lightweight back mount manually controlled closed circuit rebreather – lightweight back mount mCCR
    - KISS Sidewinder – Symmetrical side mount manually controlled closed circuit rebreather – Lightweight sidemount mCCR
    - KISS Sidekick – Side mount manually controlled closed circuit or semi-closed circuit rebreather – Sidemount SCR/mCCR
    - KISS GEM – Back mount semi-closed circuit rebreather – Compact back mount SCR
- JJ CCR – A technical diving rebreather built to allow mounting of large cylinders to enable carrying larger quantities of bailout gas on the rebreather frame.
- Divesoft Liberty rebreathers Back and sidemount mixed gas technical diving rebreathers.
- Mark 29 Underwater Breathing Apparatus
- Poseidon Diving Systems – Swedish manufacturer of diving equipment
  - Poseidon MkVI – the world's first fully automatic closed circuit rebreather for recreational use, based on the Cis-Lunar MK5 design and further developed into,
  - Poseidon SE7EN.
- Prism 2 – Notable for a radial scrubber and high-current oxygen cells from the Navy MK15 unit enabling an analogue gauge to read the oxygen levels.
- ScubaForce
  - SF2 (rebreather) – Back or sidemount ECCR with bellows counterlung.
- Siebe Gorman – British manufacturer of diving equipment and salvage contractor
  - Siebe Gorman CDBA – Type of diving rebreather used by the Royal Navy – also CDMBA, SCBA, SCMBA, UBA
  - A type introduced in 1999 in the British Navy, being an update of the BioMarine/Carleton MK16:
- Some military rebreathers (for example the US Navy MK-25 and the MK-16 mixed-gas rebreather), and the Phibian CCS50 and CCS100 rebreathers, were developed by Oceanic.
- The current US Navy Mark 16 Mod 2 (Explosive Ordnance Disposal) and Mark 16 Mod 3 (Naval Special Warfare) units use the Juergensen Defense Corporation Mark V Control System.
- The Orca ECR is a CCR design that has both carbon dioxide and oxygen monitoring
- The Megalodon
- The rEvo III
- The O_{2}ptima CM
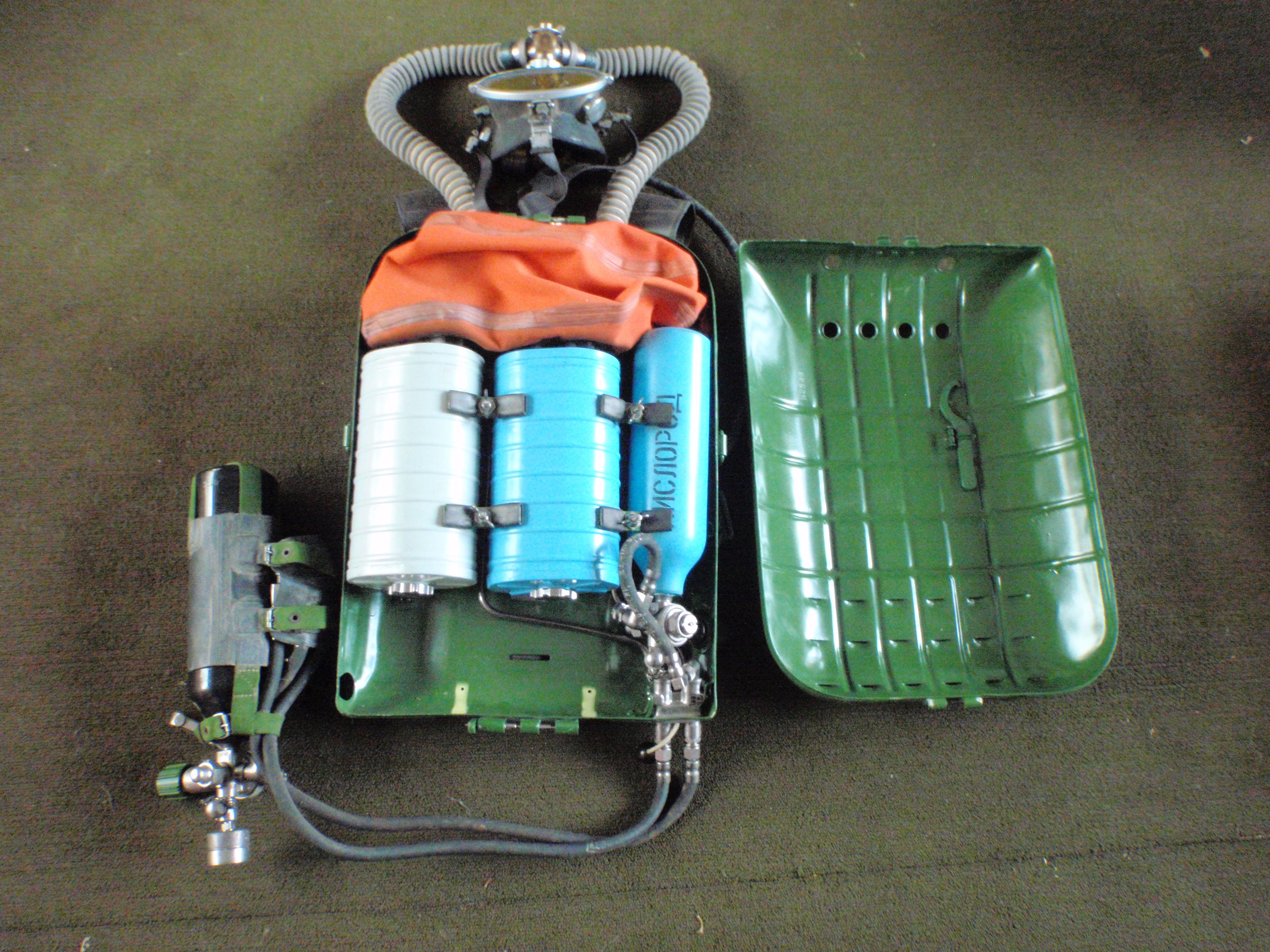
IDA-71 with lid of casing opened showing interior

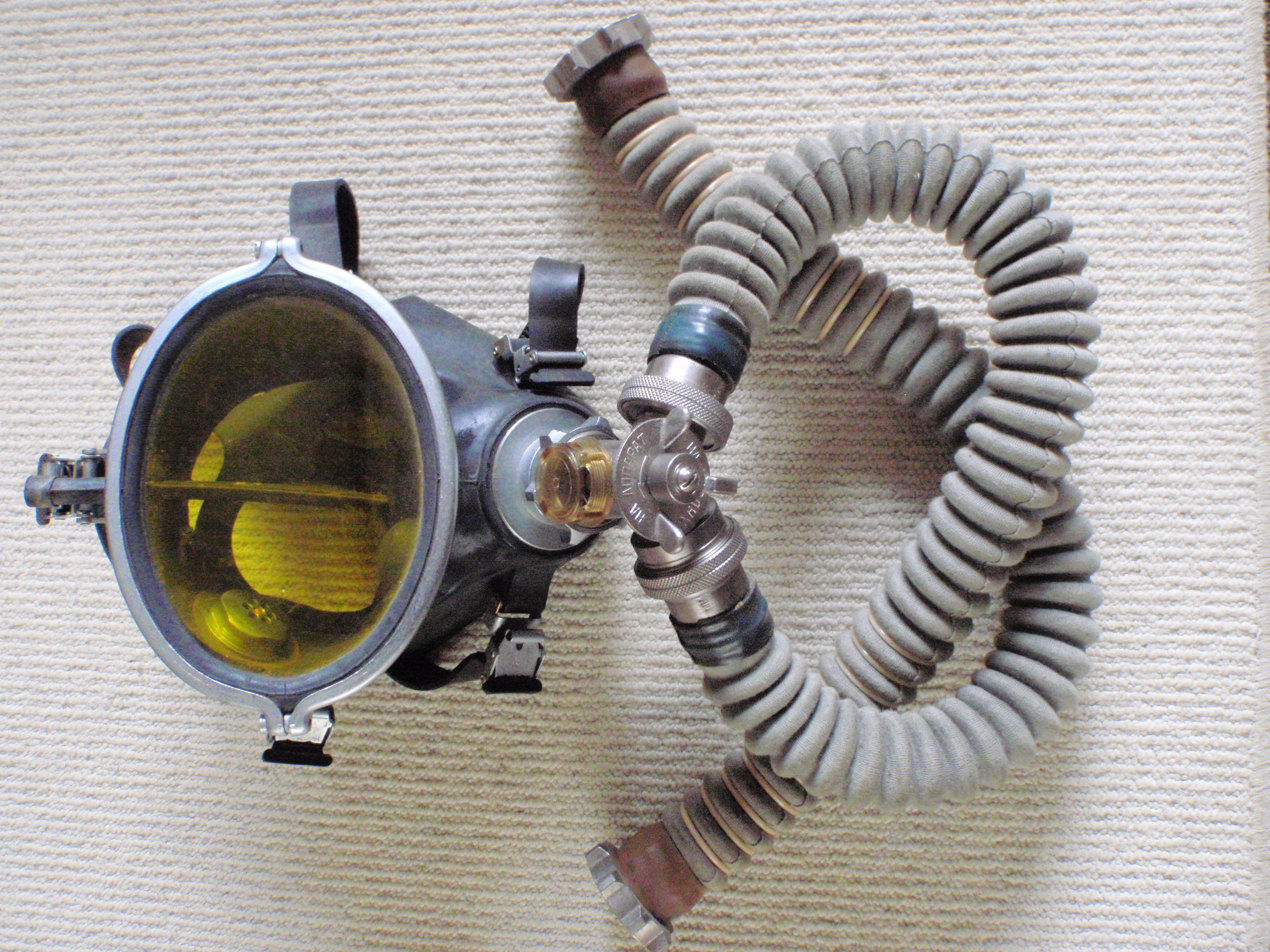
IDA-71 mask, DSV and breathing hoses

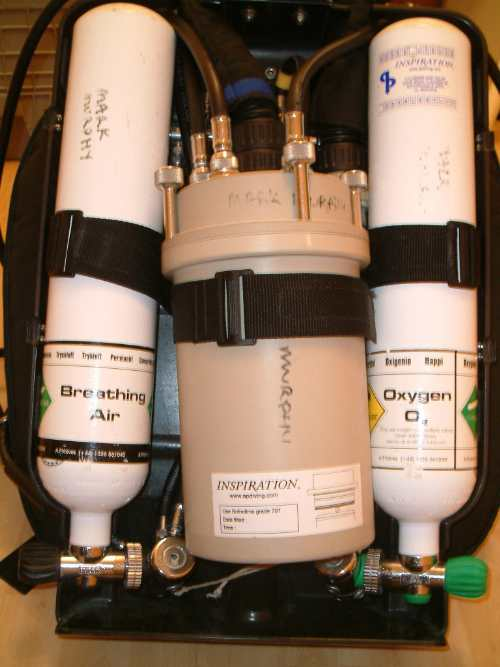
Inspiration with casing open showing interior

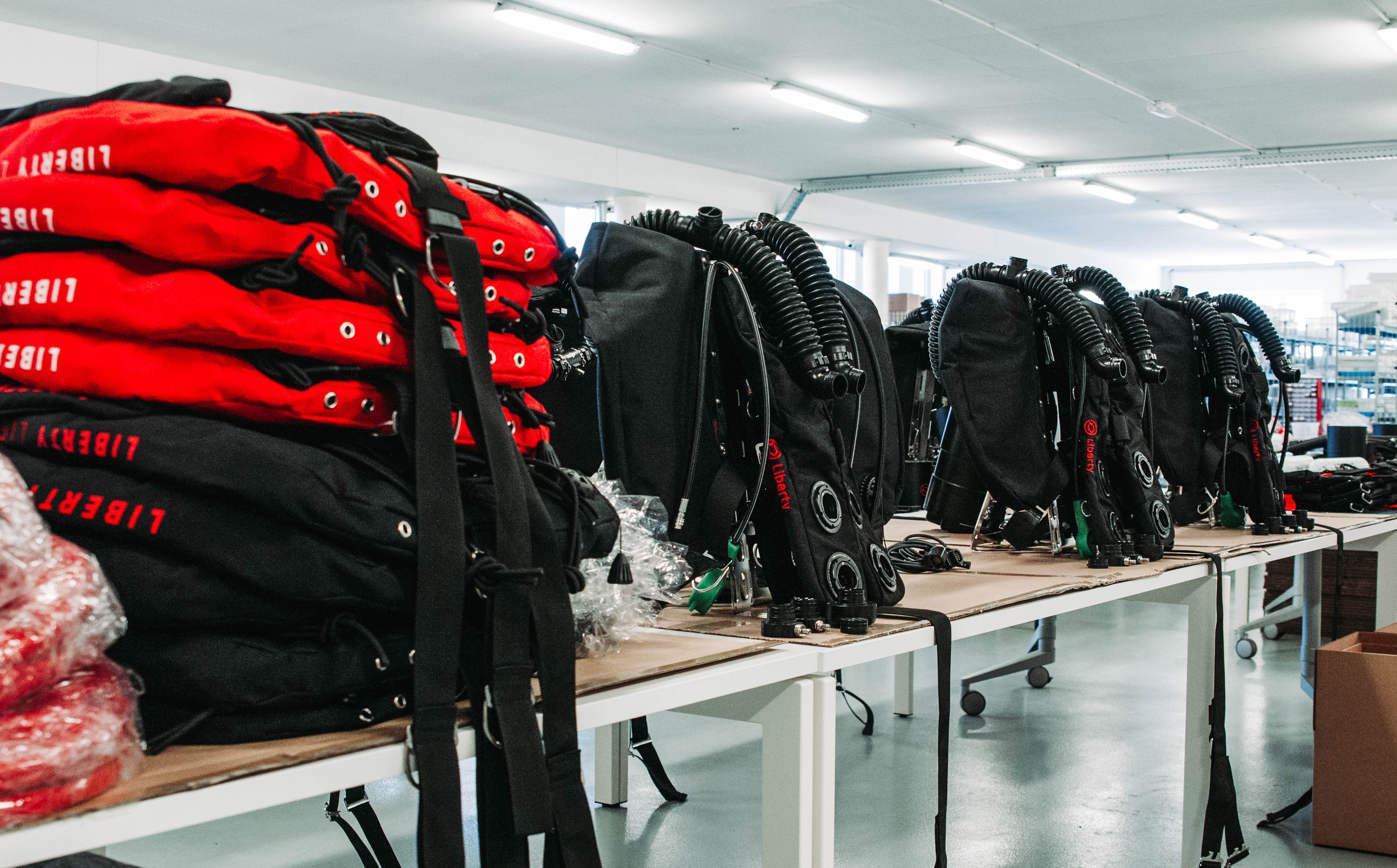
Liberty closed circuit rebreathers

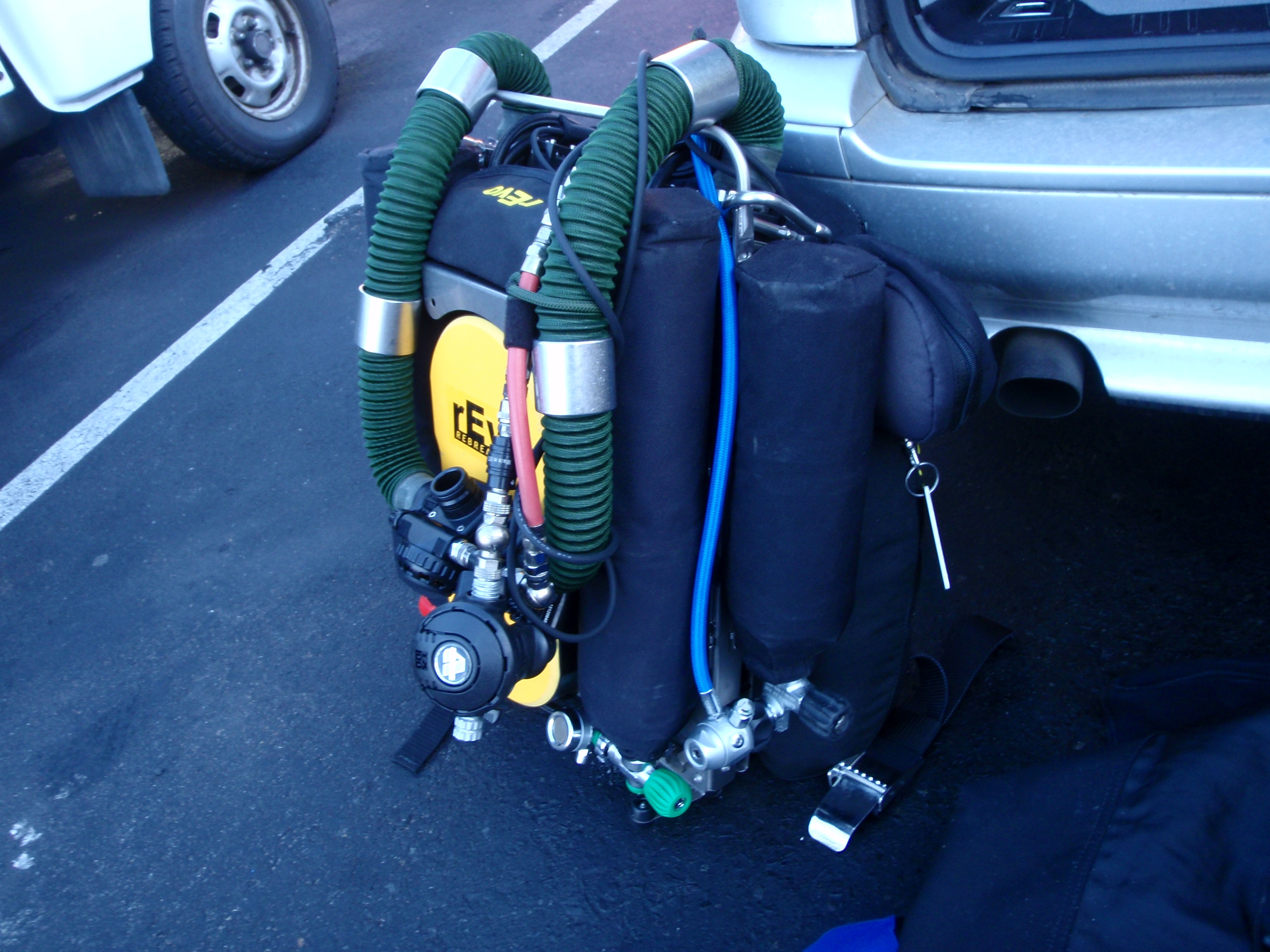
rEvo rebreather back view, right side

== See also ==
- Carbon dioxide scrubber – Device which absorbs carbon dioxide from circulated gas
- Escape breathing apparatus, also known as escape set – Type of portable breathing apparatus
- Primary life support system, also known as Portable Life Support System – Life support device for a space suit
- Rebreather – Portable apparatus to recycle breathing gas
- Rebreather diving – Underwater diving using self contained breathing gas recycling apparatus
- Self-contained breathing apparatus (SCBA) – Breathing gas supplied respirator carried by the user. (surface-only (industrial) breathing sets including rebreathers)
