= Halcyon PVR-BASC =

Semi-closed circuit depth compensated passive addition diving rebreather

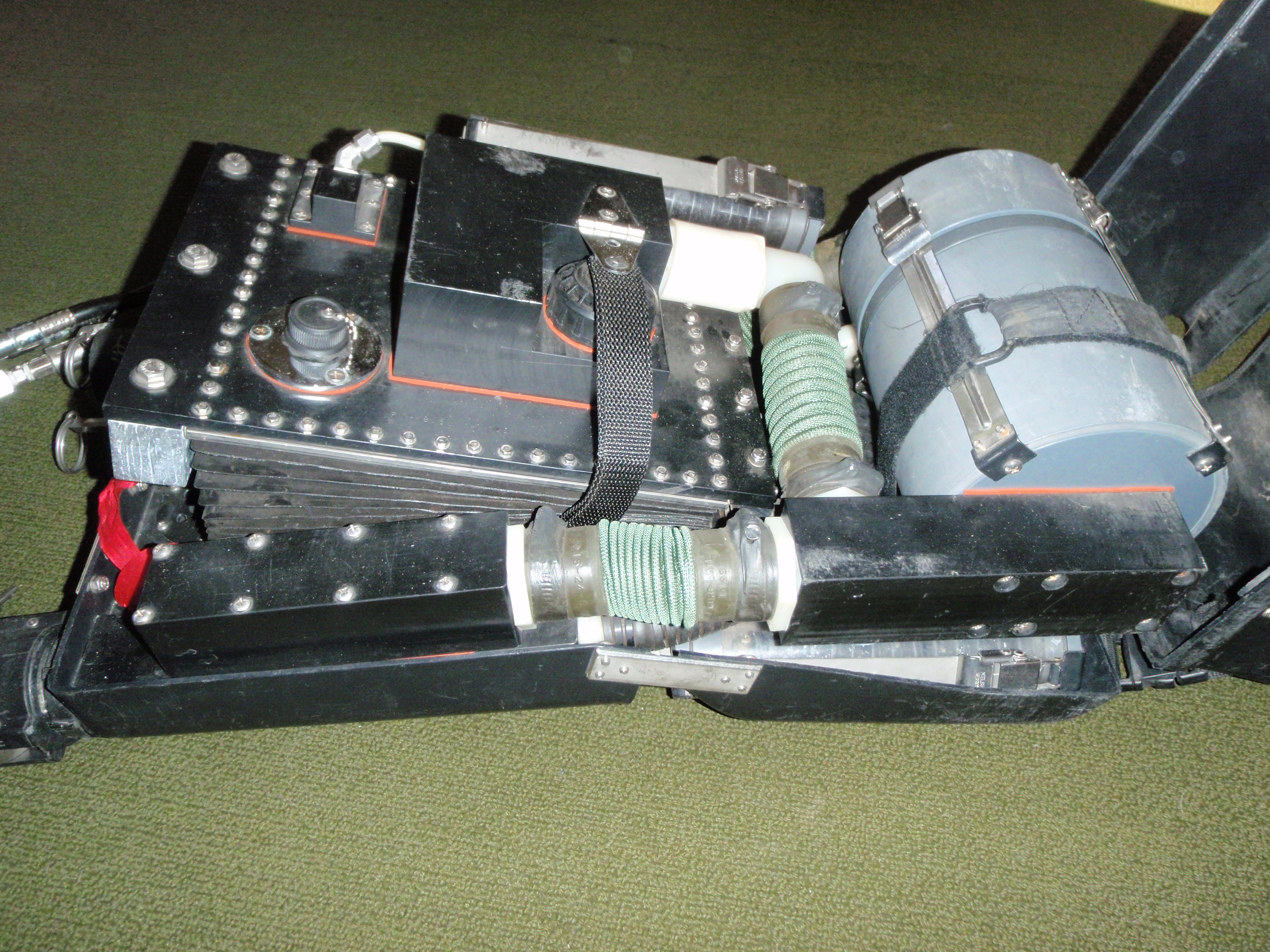
- View with cover opened
- Uses: Breathing apparatus for underwater cave exploration
- Manufacturer: Halcyon
- Model: PVR-BASC

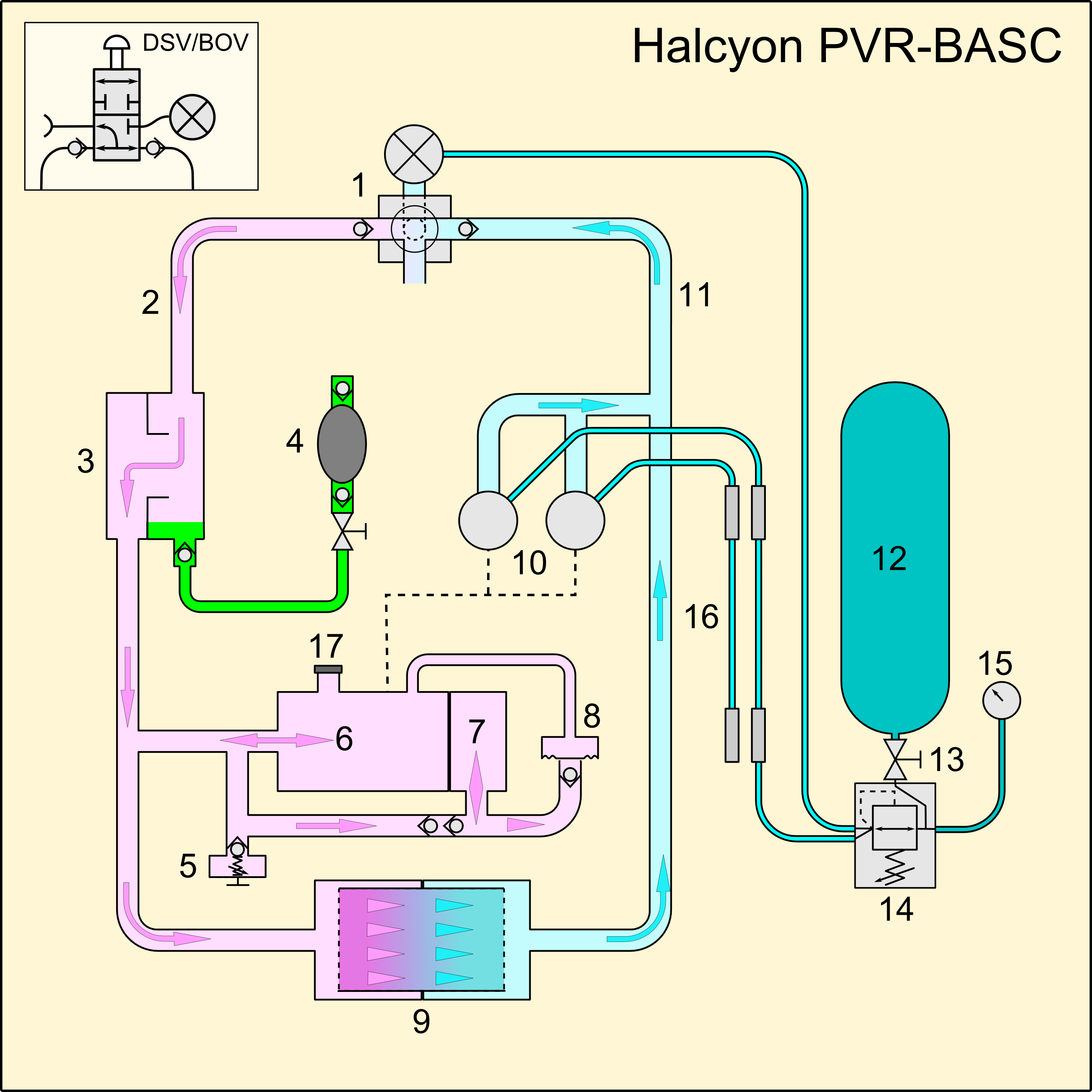
Schematic diagram of the breathing loop and gas supply pneumatics of the Halcyon PVR-BASC Rebreather.: 1 DSV/BOV with non-return valves; 2 Exhalation hose; 3 Primary water trap; 4 Manual drain pump; 5 Overpressure relief valve; 6 Main bellows counterlung; 7 Discharge bellows counterlung (variable volume); 8 Discharge valve; 9 Axial flow scrubber with secondary water trap; 10 Feed gas demand valves; 11 Inhalation hose; 12 Feed gas supply cylinder; 13 Cylinder valve; 14 High pressure regulator (1st stage); 15 Submersible pressure gauge; 16 Intermediate pressure gas connectors; 17 Drain port for cleaning and drying counterlung

The Halcyon Passive, Variable Ratio-Biased Addition Semi-Closed rebreather is a unique design of semi-closed rebreather using a depth-compensated passive gas addition system. Passive addition implies that in steady state operation (at a constant depth) addition of fresh feed gas is a response to low volume of gas in the loop - the gas is injected when the top of the counterlung activates a demand type addition valve, which provides feed gas as long as the diver continues to inhale. The mechanism discharges gas to the environment in proportion to breathing volume to induce this gas feed.

In the PVR-BASC the discharged gas volume is a function of depth and breath volume. The passive addition occurs during each inhalation as the loop volume is deficient by the amount discharged. The volumetric ratio of discharged gas to exhaled gas volume varies with depth, and decreases as the pressure increases.

At the surface one quarter of the volume of an exhaled breath is discharged. As the ambient pressure increases with depth, the volume of the inner counterlumg is reduced and the reduced discharge both provides an oxygen addition more closely matched to usage, and saves a considerable amount of gas.

Gas is added to the loop after the scrubber, and this means that the fresh gas is immediately available for breathing. It also means that the calculation of inhalation gas oxygen fraction must take this into account. This also reduces exposure of the scrubber absorbent medium to cold gas, and increases dwell time of exhaled gas in the scrubber, both of which improve the efficiency of CO_{2} absorption.

Gas discharge takes place before the remaining exhaled gas reaches the scrubber, so the discharged gas does not waste scrubber capacity. The fresh gas is added when the counterlung cover bottoms out towards the end of a breath, so the fresh gas is largely inhaled into respiratory dead space, and most of the mixing occurs after exhalation.

Excess gas due to expansion during ascent is vented through the overpressure relief valve.

The proportionality of the discharge counterlung volume to depth is lost below a depth of around 90 m (10 bar) so the gas saving below this depth is not as great as for shallower dives. The slightly higher feed rates will push the partial pressure of oxygen in the loop closer to the feed gas value.

== Counterlung ==
The PVR-BASC has a hinged bellows counterlung, similar to that of the Interspiro DCSC, and like the DCSC the top cover of the counterlung is weighted to improve breathing effort. However unlike the DCSC, the PVR-BASC uses an internal secondary bellows to discharge a portion of the exhaled gas during the inhalation part of the breathing cycle, when the main counterlung closes and pumps out the contents of the inner bellows. The reduction in volume of the inner counterlung with depth results in an approximation of a mass discharge proportional to breathing volume.

== Harness ==
The PVR-BASC is designed to be carried on a standard Hogarthian backplate and wing harness.

== Gas supply ==
The frame is designed to carry a cylinder on each side. The only restrictions on size are what the diver can carry, and the scrubber endurance. The cylinders are normally rigged with open circuit regulators in the standard DIR configuration for bailout, and a supply hose with quick connector on each for the rebreather supply.

== Loop oxygen fraction ==
The rebreather maintains a substantially constant breathing gas composition at any given depth regardless of the level of exertion, but gas consumption will vary with exertion.

== Gallery ==
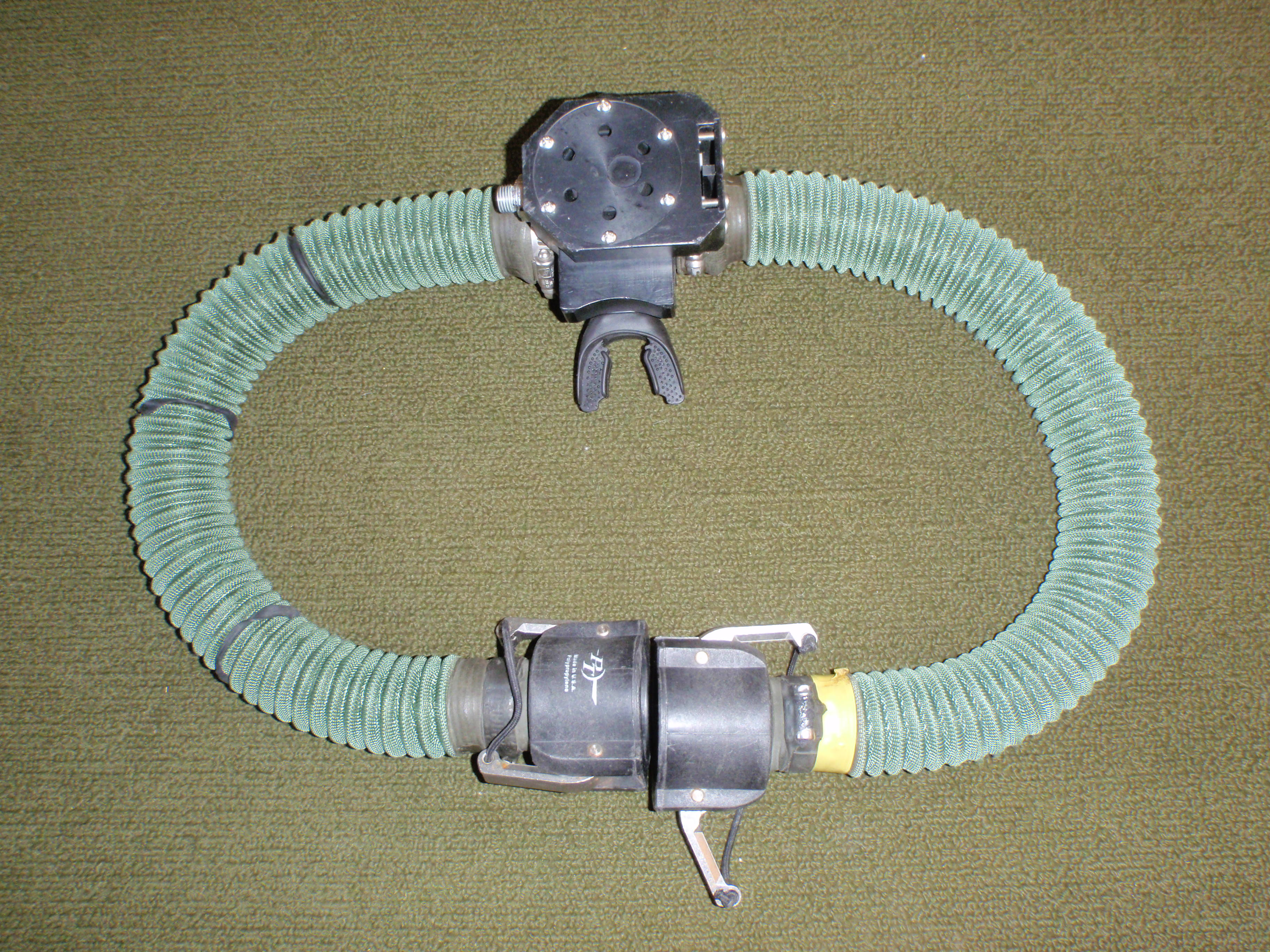
Halcyon PVR-BASC BOV/DSV and breathing hoses

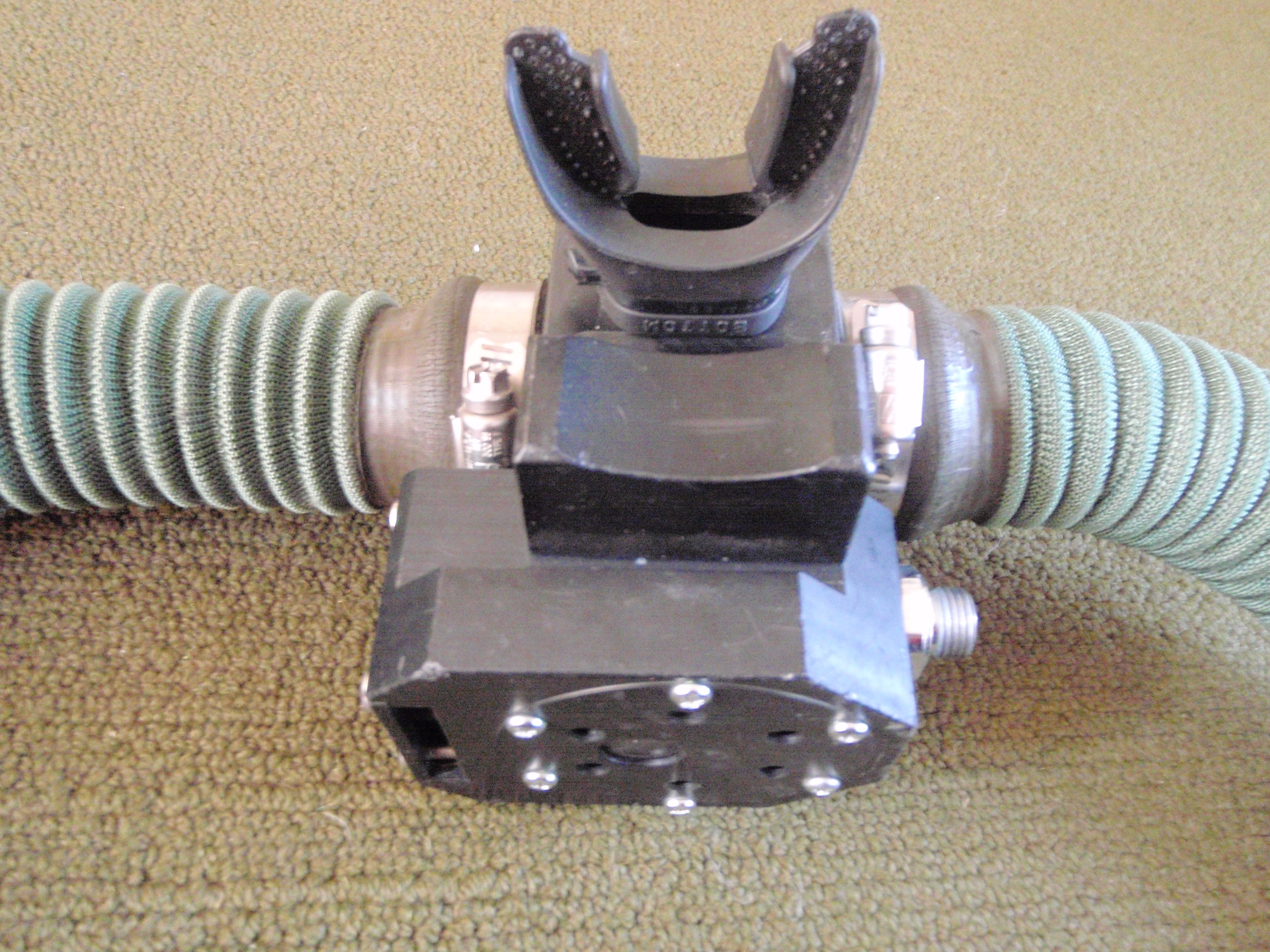
Halcyon PVR-BASC Bailout valve/Dive-surface valve

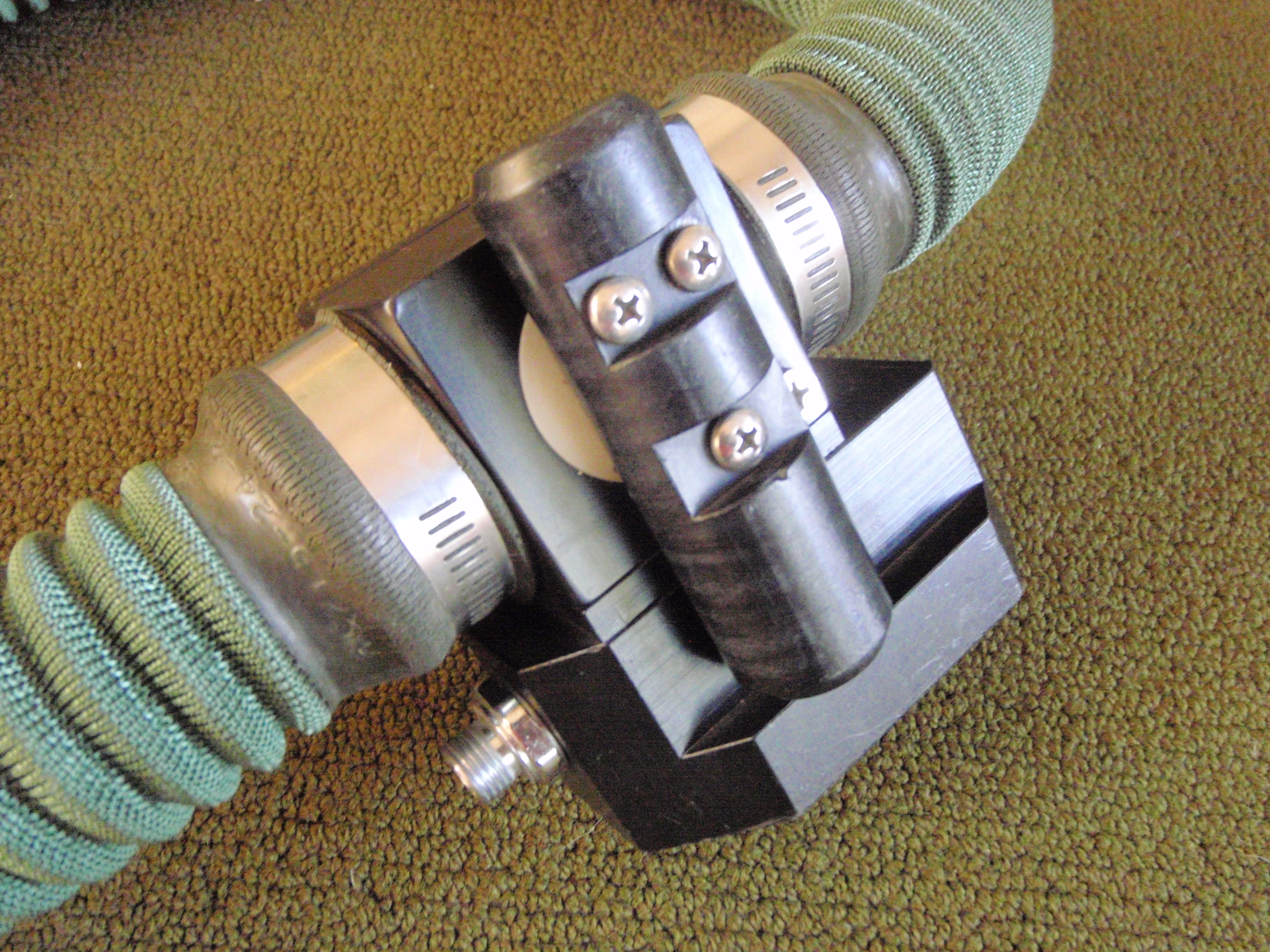
Halcyon PVR-BASC BOV/DSV Bailout valve/Dive-surface valve

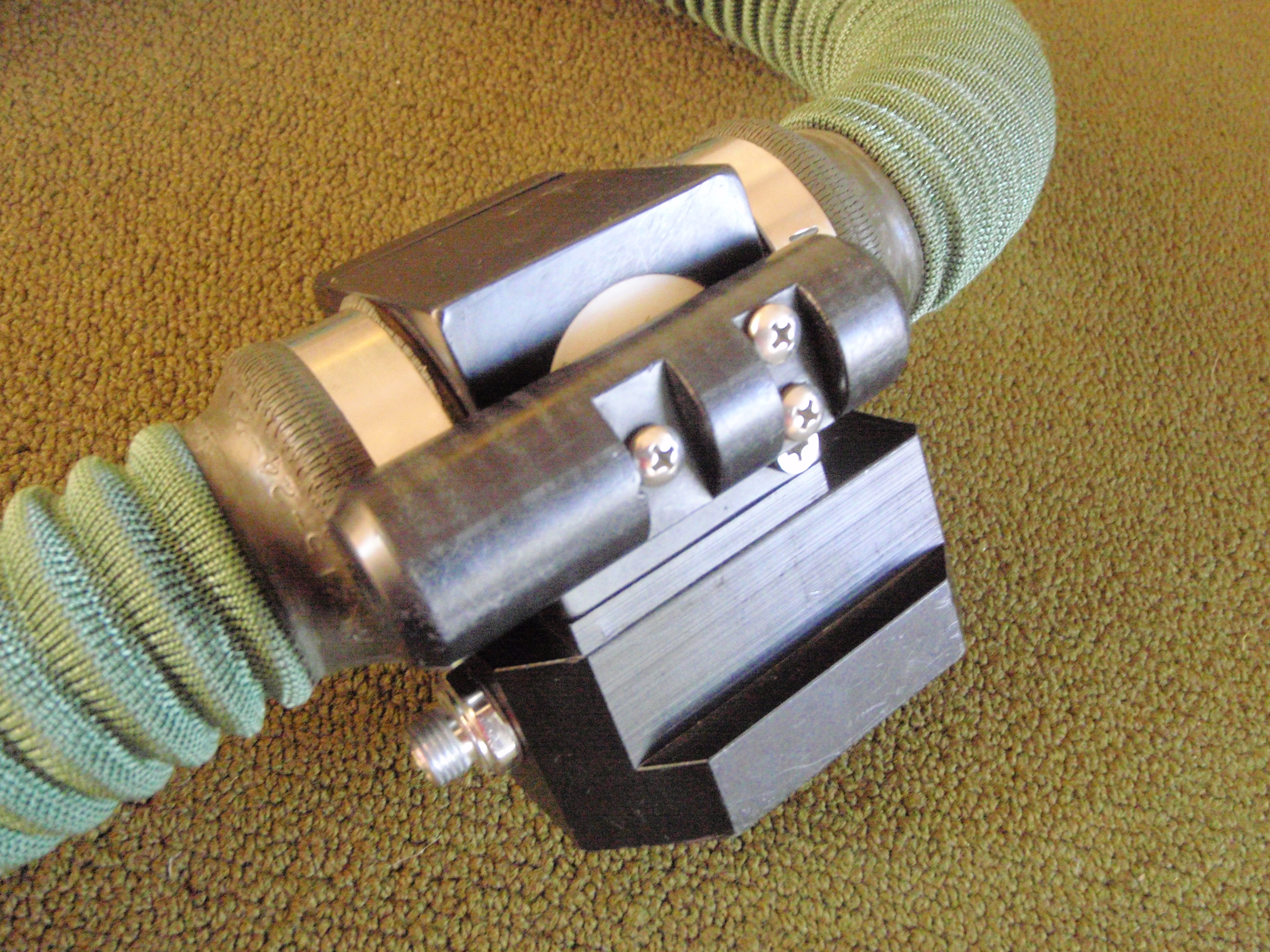
Halcyon PVR-BASC BOV/DSV Bailout valve/Dive-surface valve

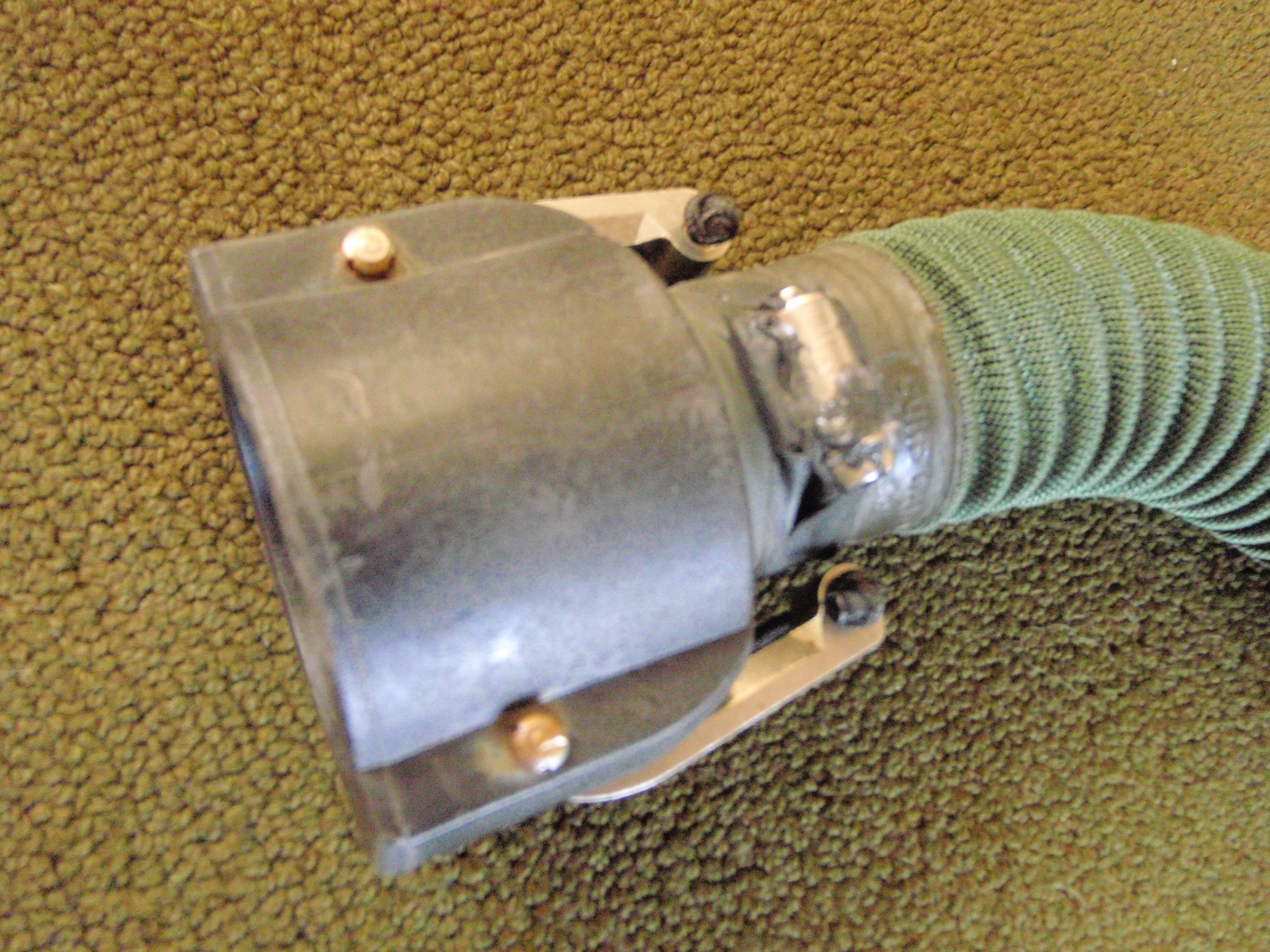
Halcyon PVR-BASC breathing hose connector

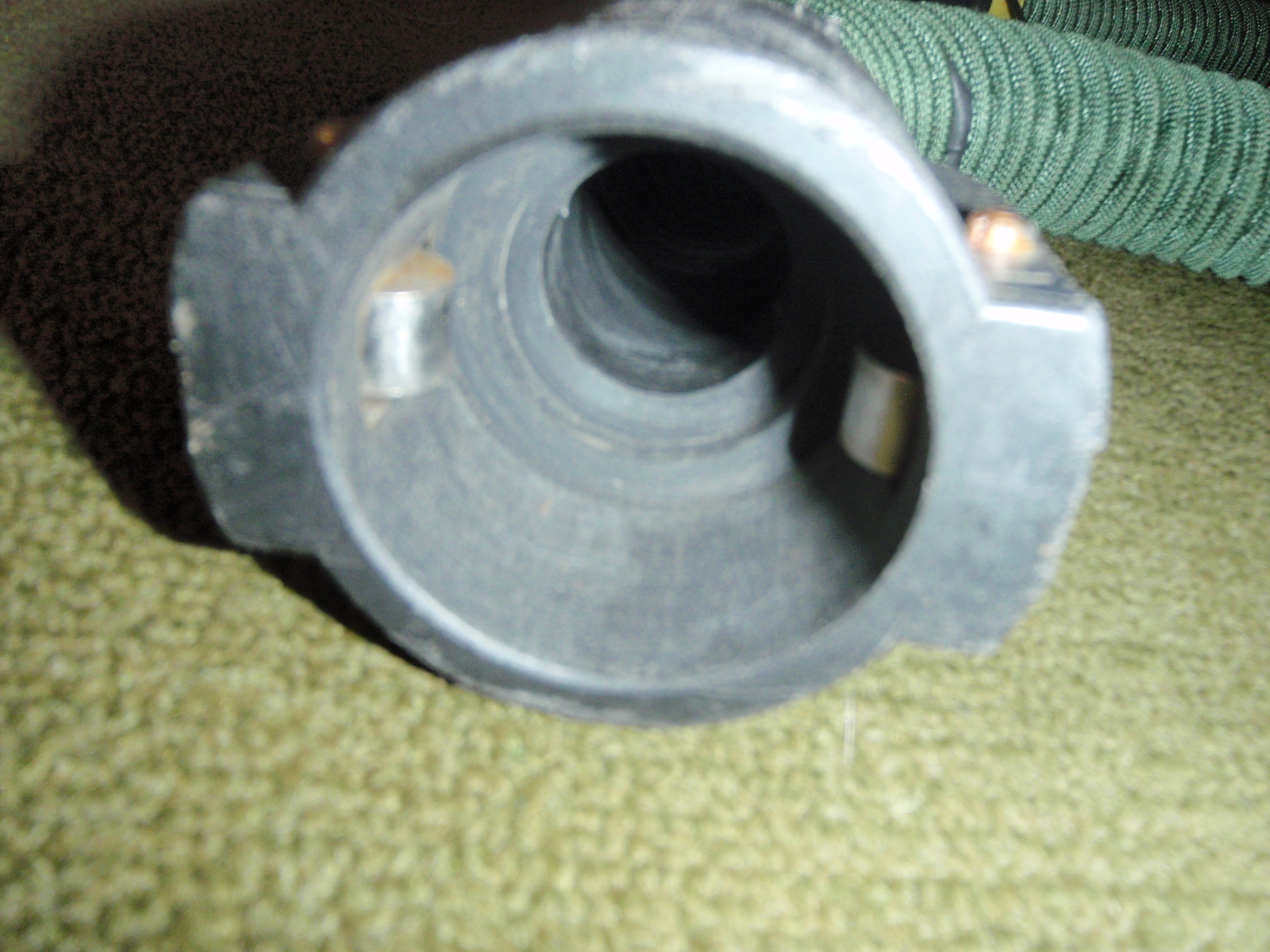
Halcyon PVR-BASC BOV/DSV breathing hose connector

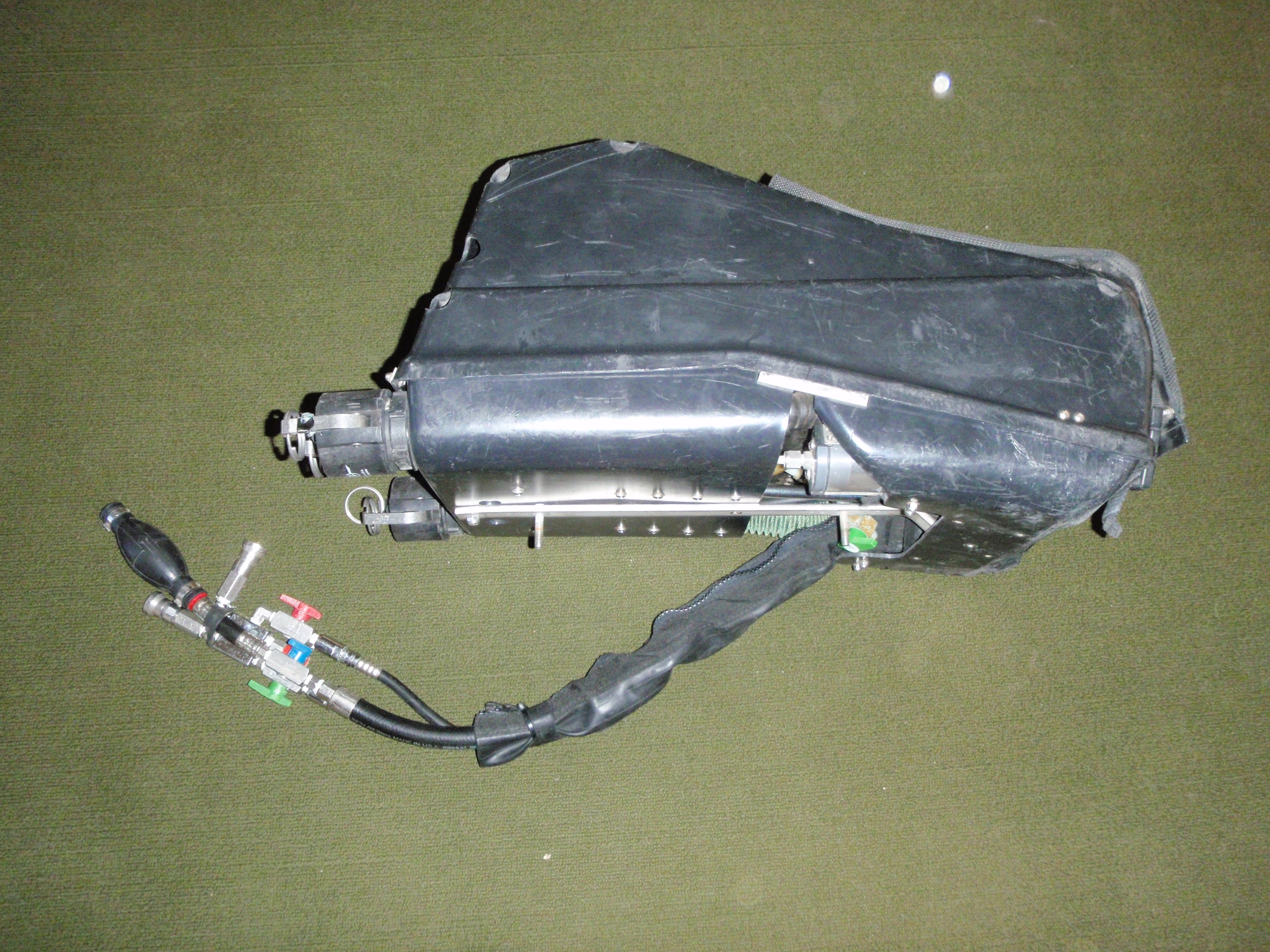
Halcyon PVR-BASC BOV/DSV side view with cover

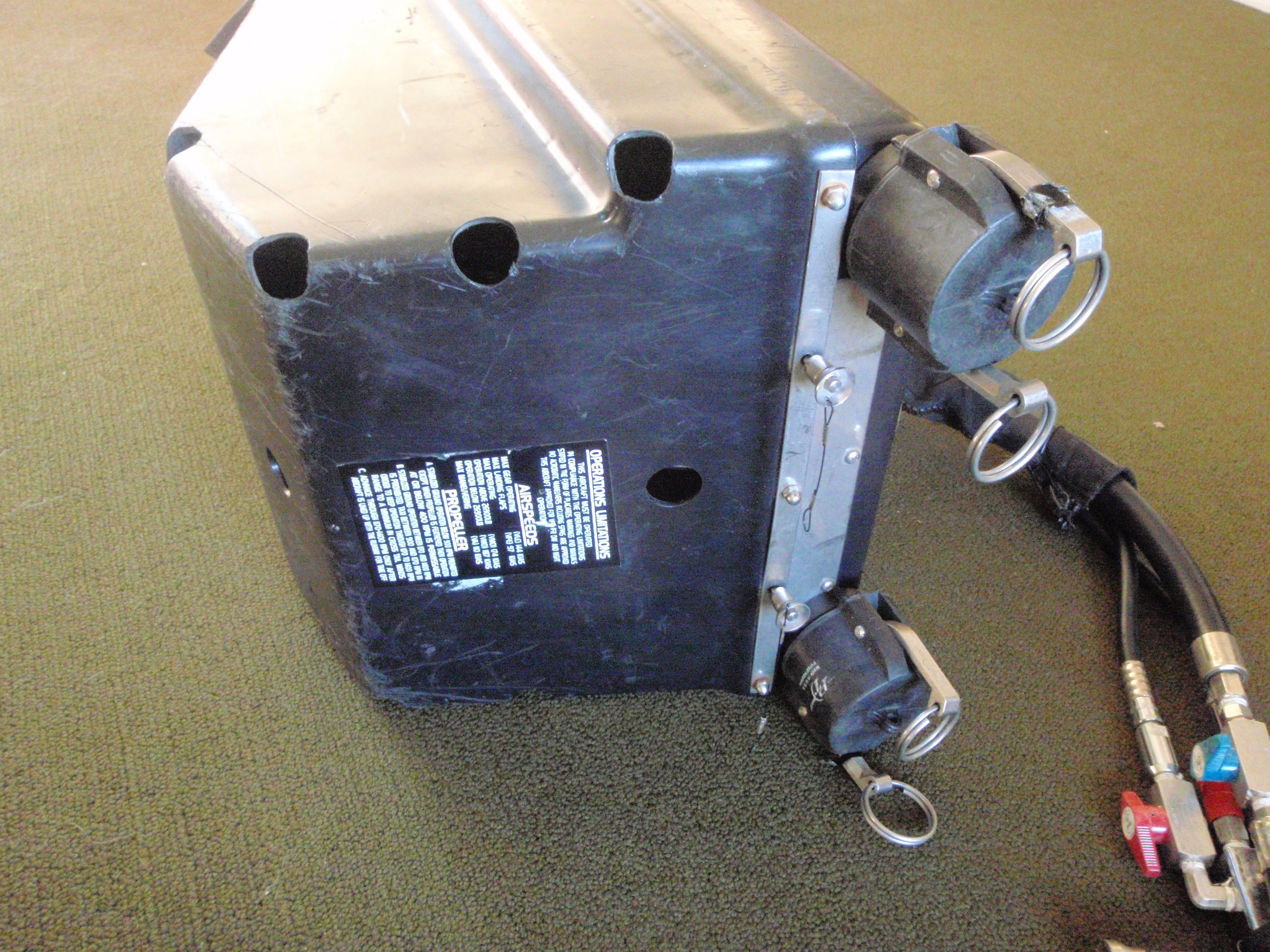
Halcyon PVR-BASC BOV/DSV top end view with cover

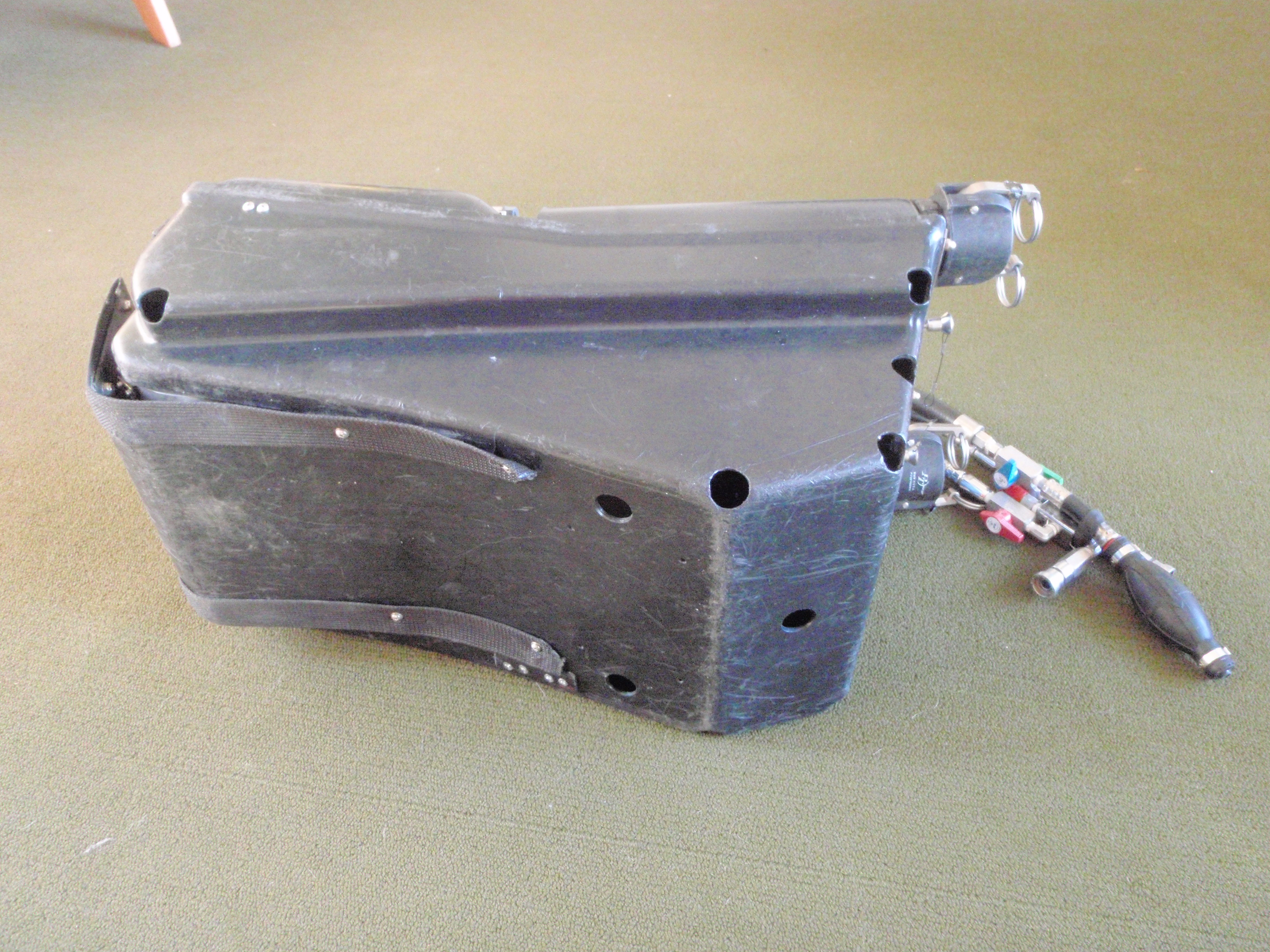
Halcyon PVR-BASC BOV/DSV with cover

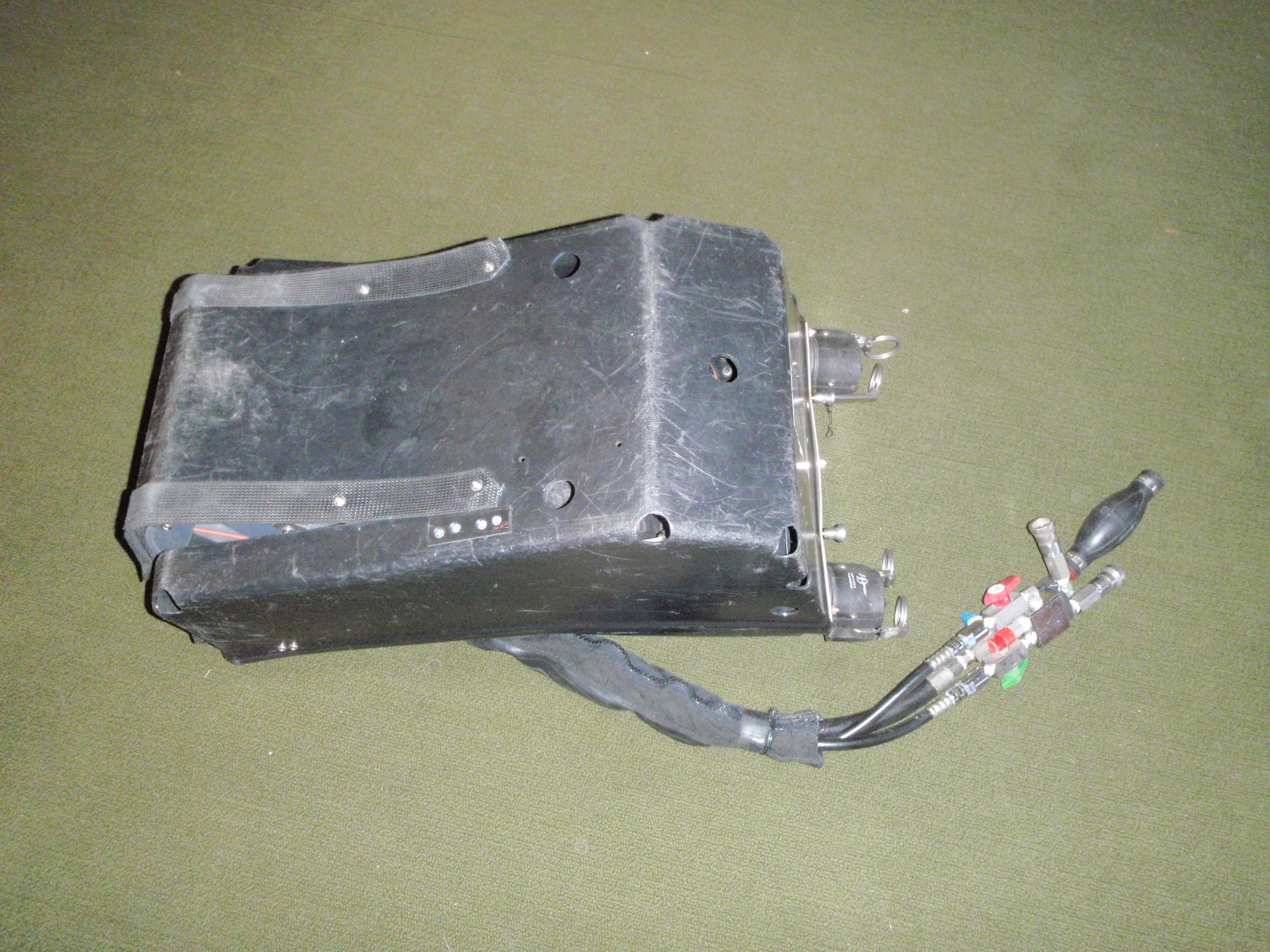
Halcyon PVR-BASC BOV/DSV with cover

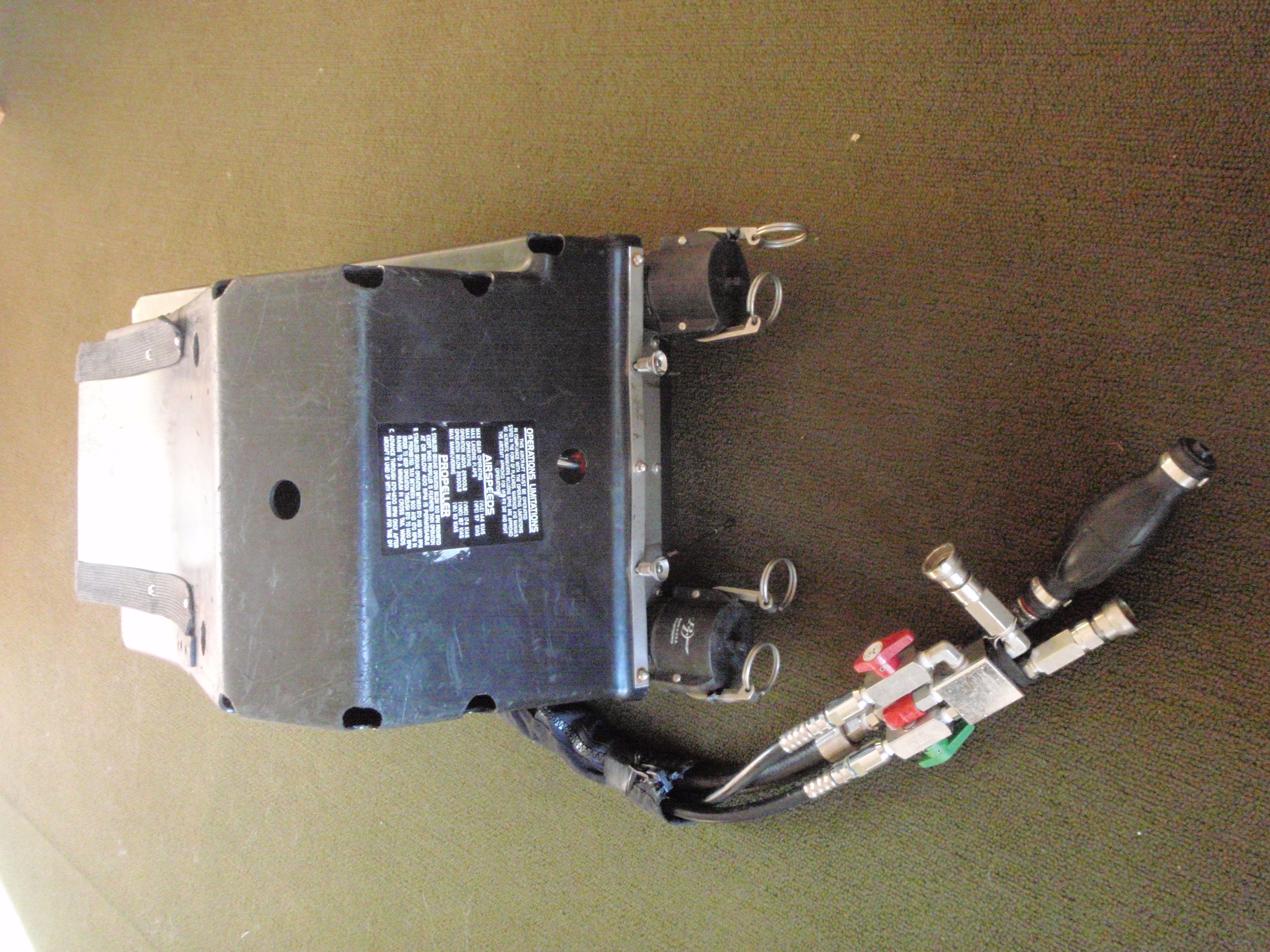
Halcyon PVR-BASC semi-closed circuit rebreather - closed, from top/front

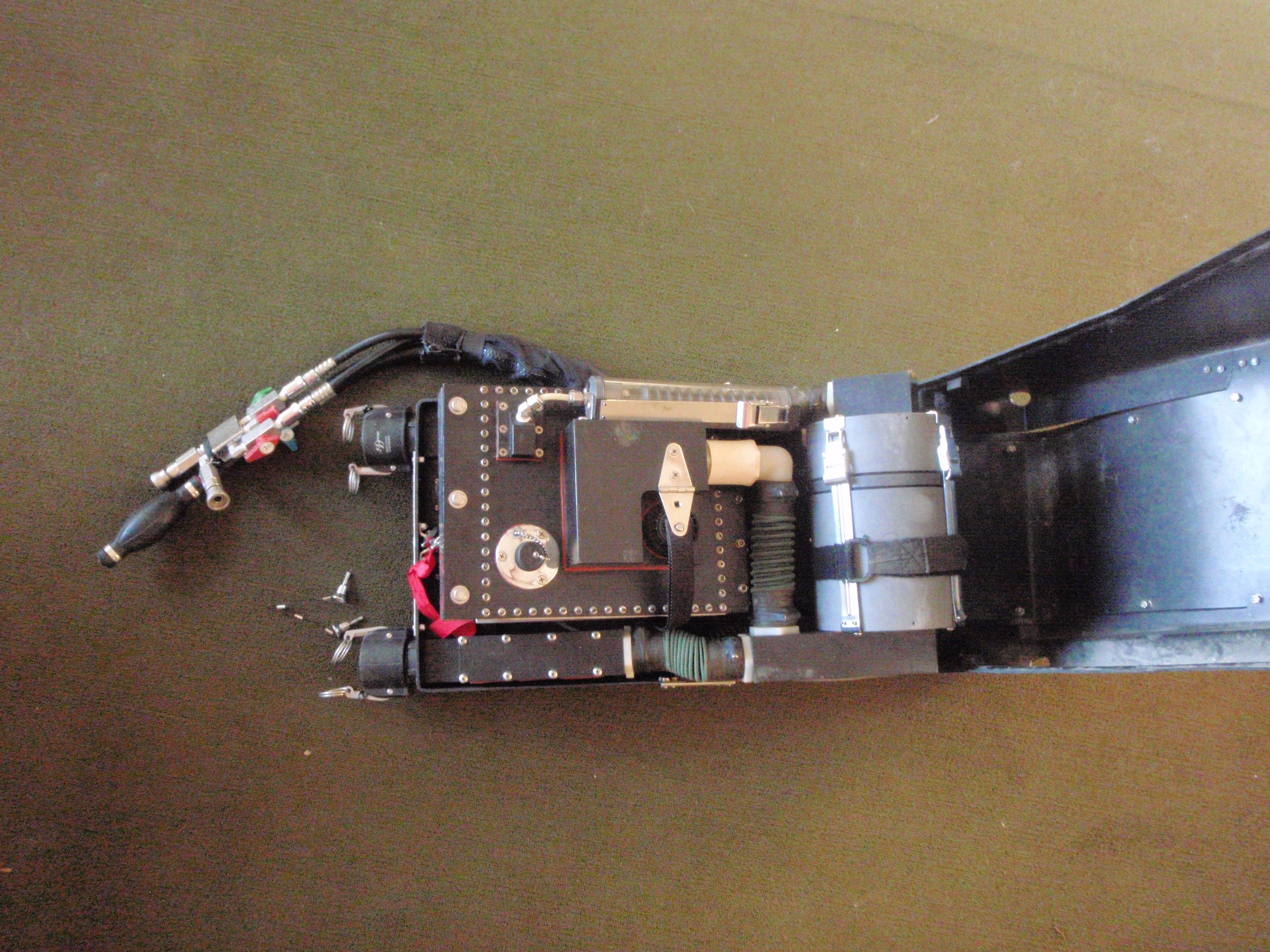
Halcyon PVR-BASC semi-closed circuit rebreather - open, from above

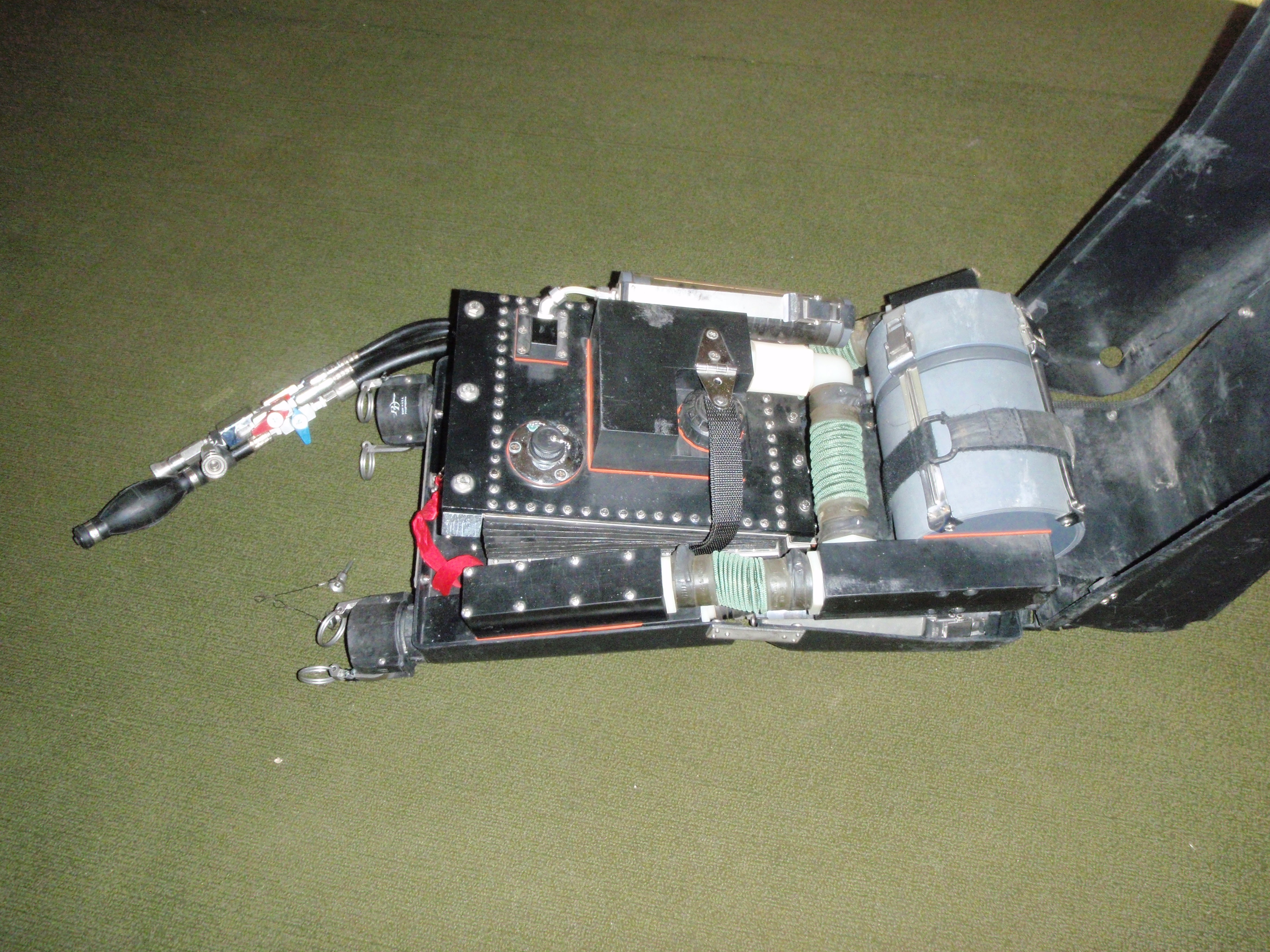
Halcyon PVR-BASC semi-closed circuit rebreather -open from above

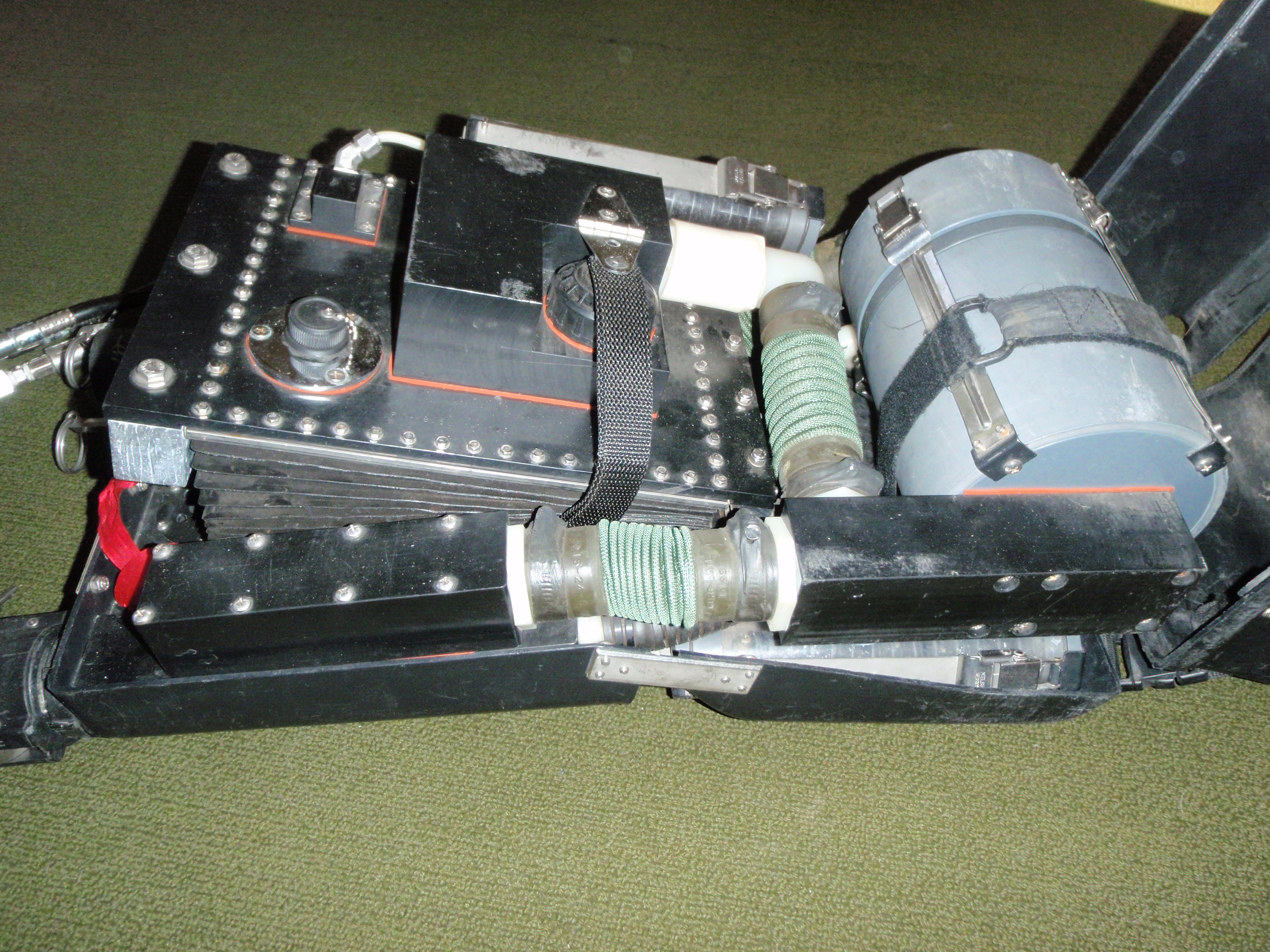
Halcyon PVR-BASC semi-closed circuit rebreather - open, from left

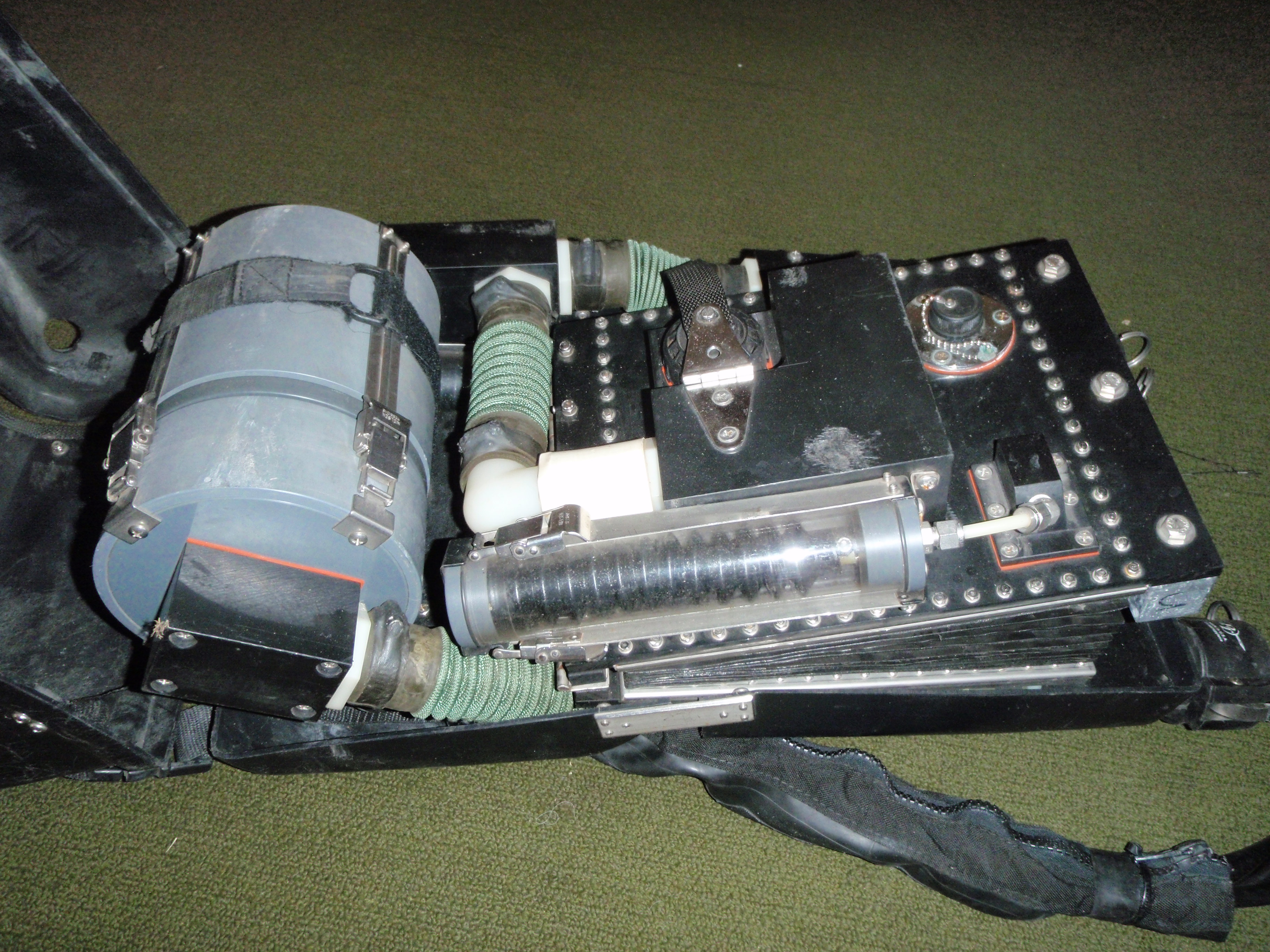
Halcyon PVR-BASC semi-closed circuit rebreather - open, from right

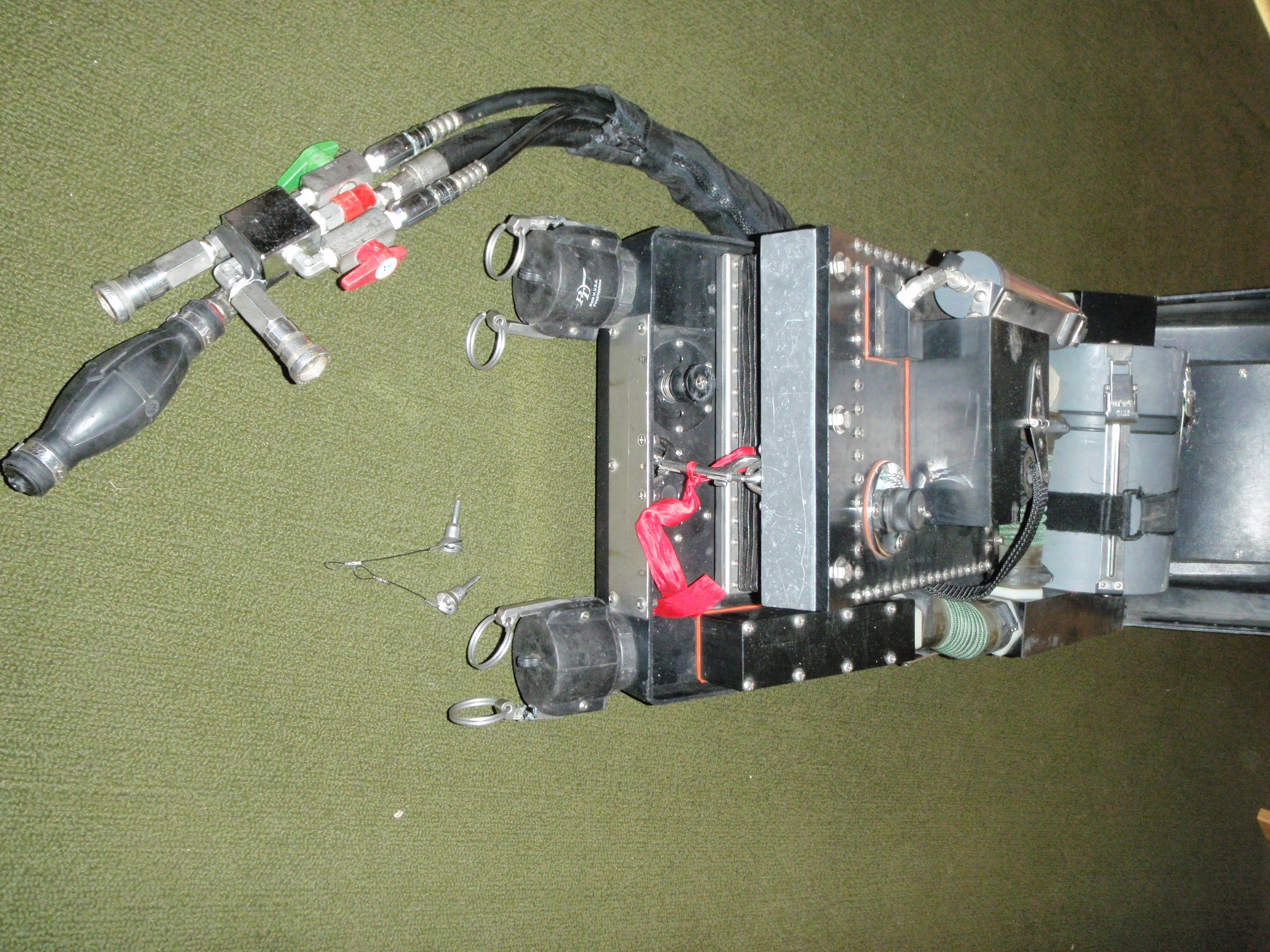
Halcyon PVR-BASC semi-closed circuit rebreather - open, from top/front

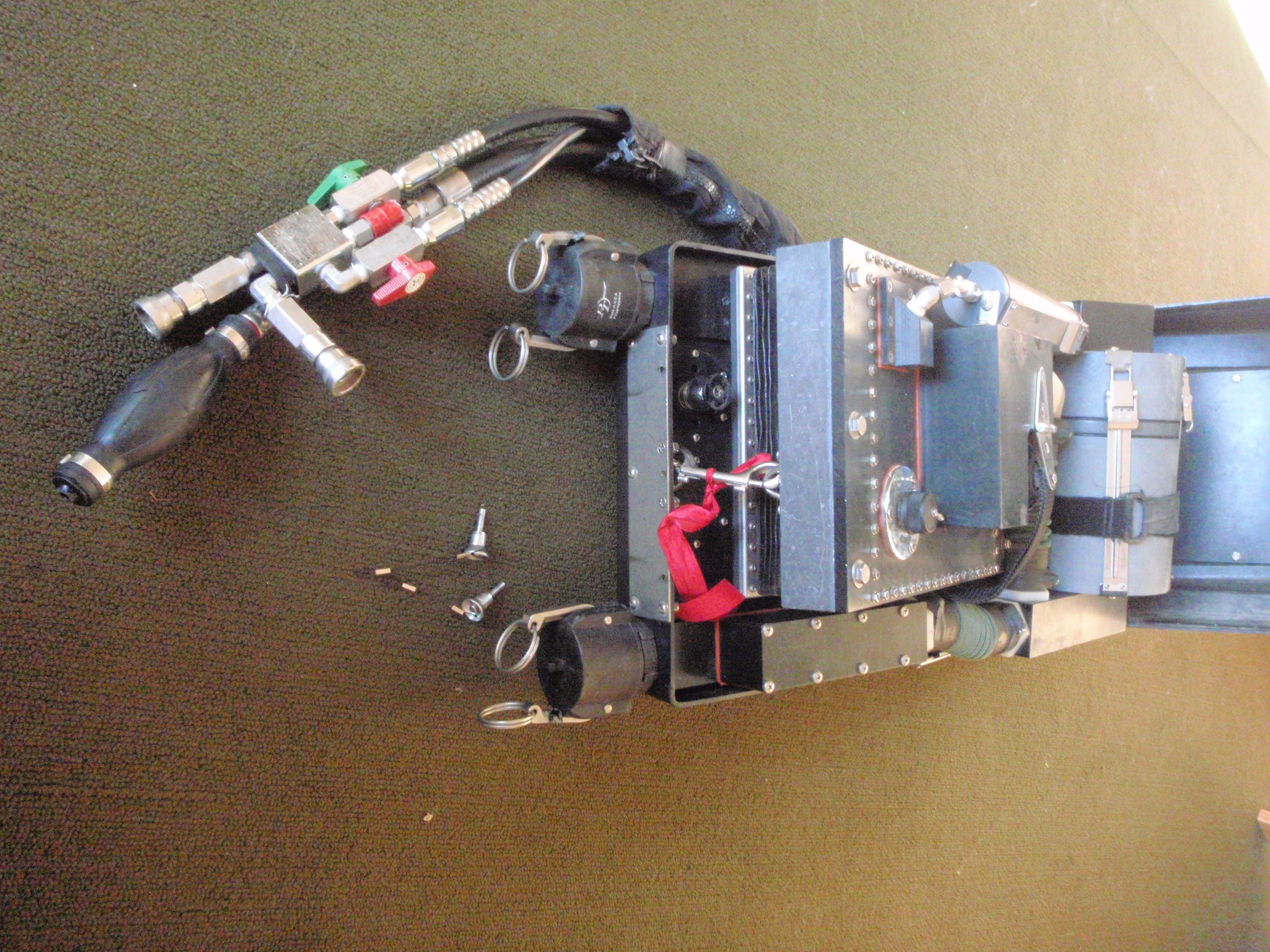
Halcyon PVR-BASC semi-closed circuit rebreather - open, from top/front

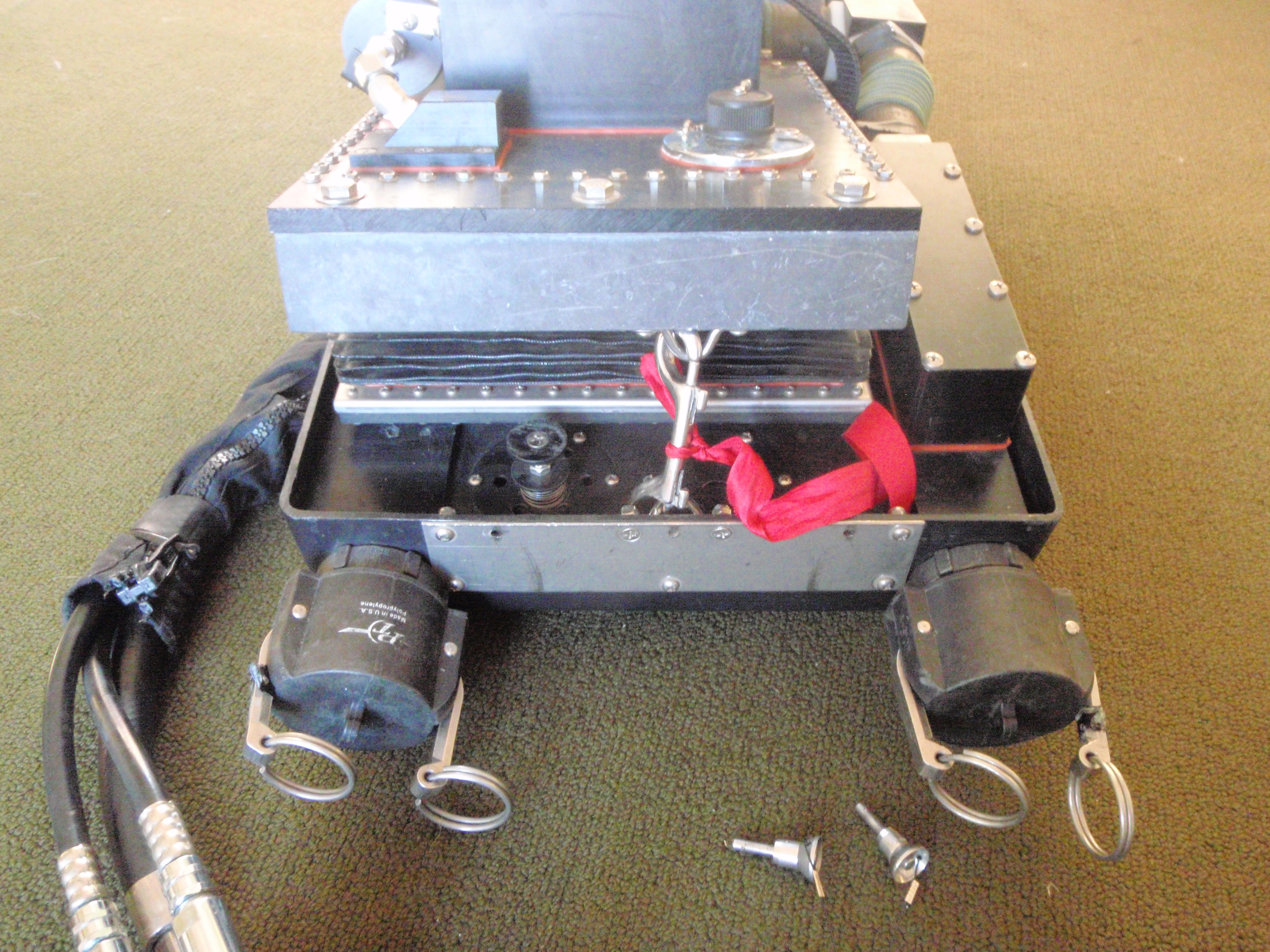
Halcyon PVR-BASC semi-closed circuit rebreather - open from top/front

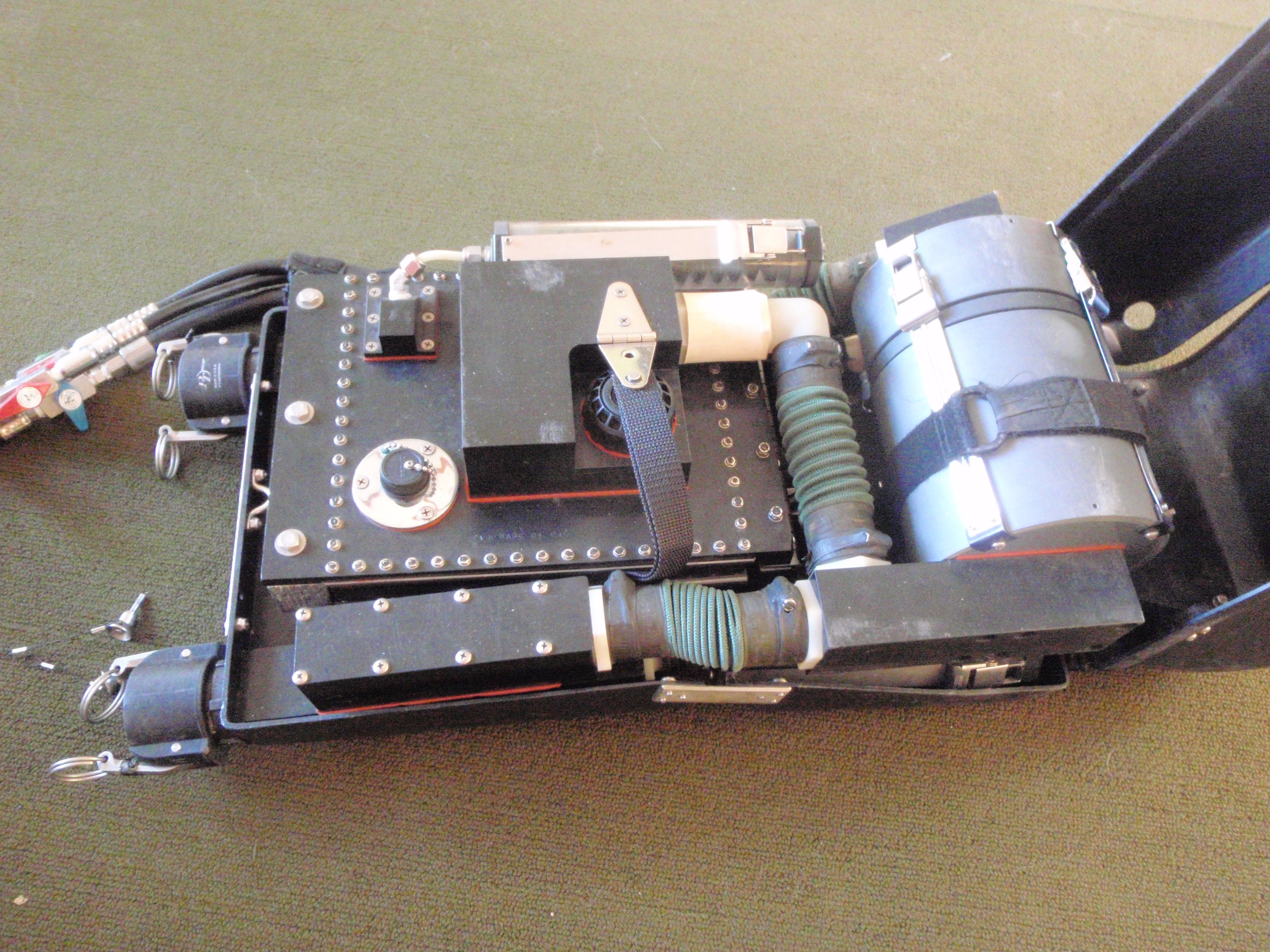
Halcyon PVR-BASC semi-closed circuit rebreather - open, from left

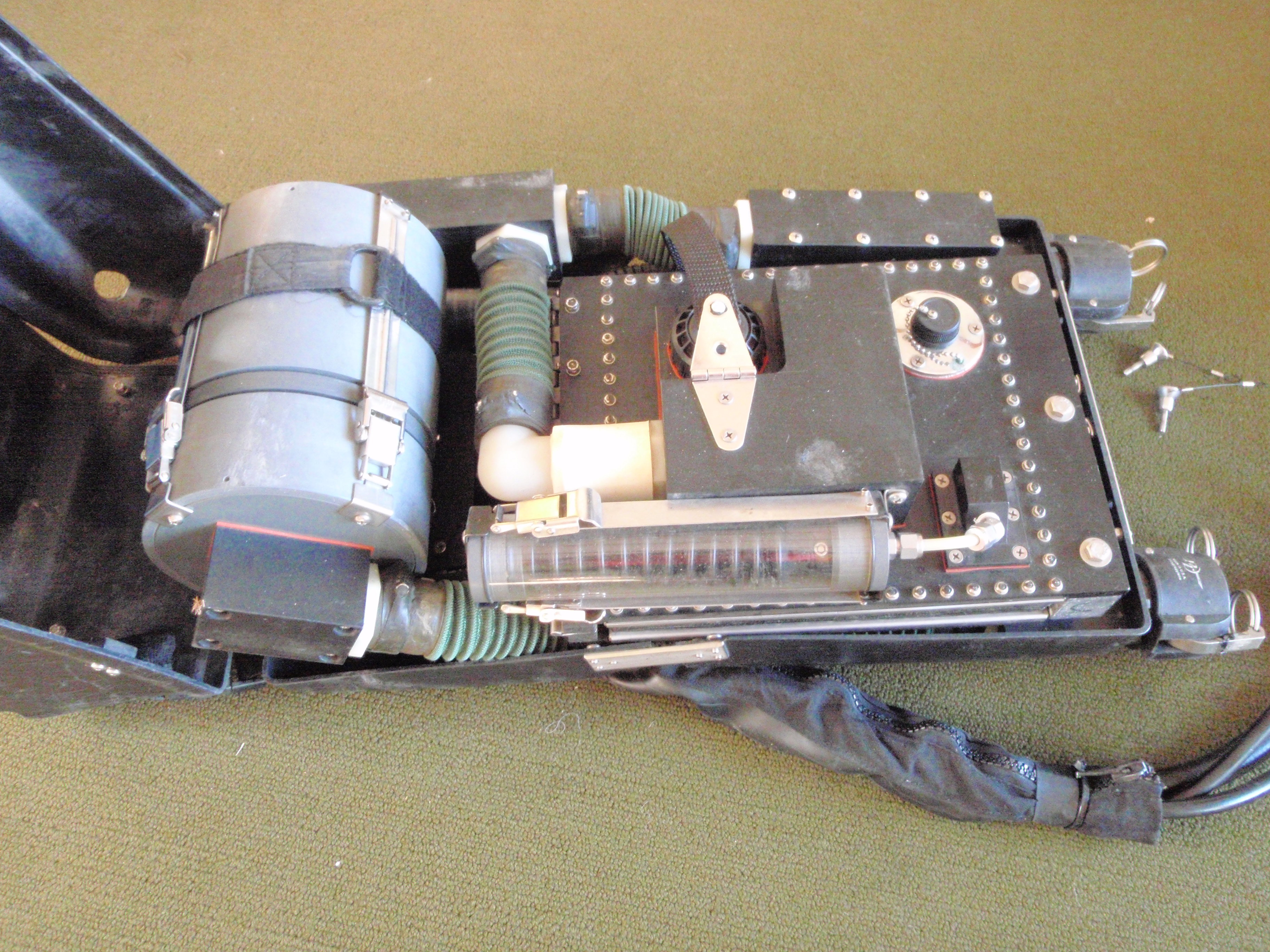
Halcyon PVR-BASC semi-closed circuit rebreather - open, from right

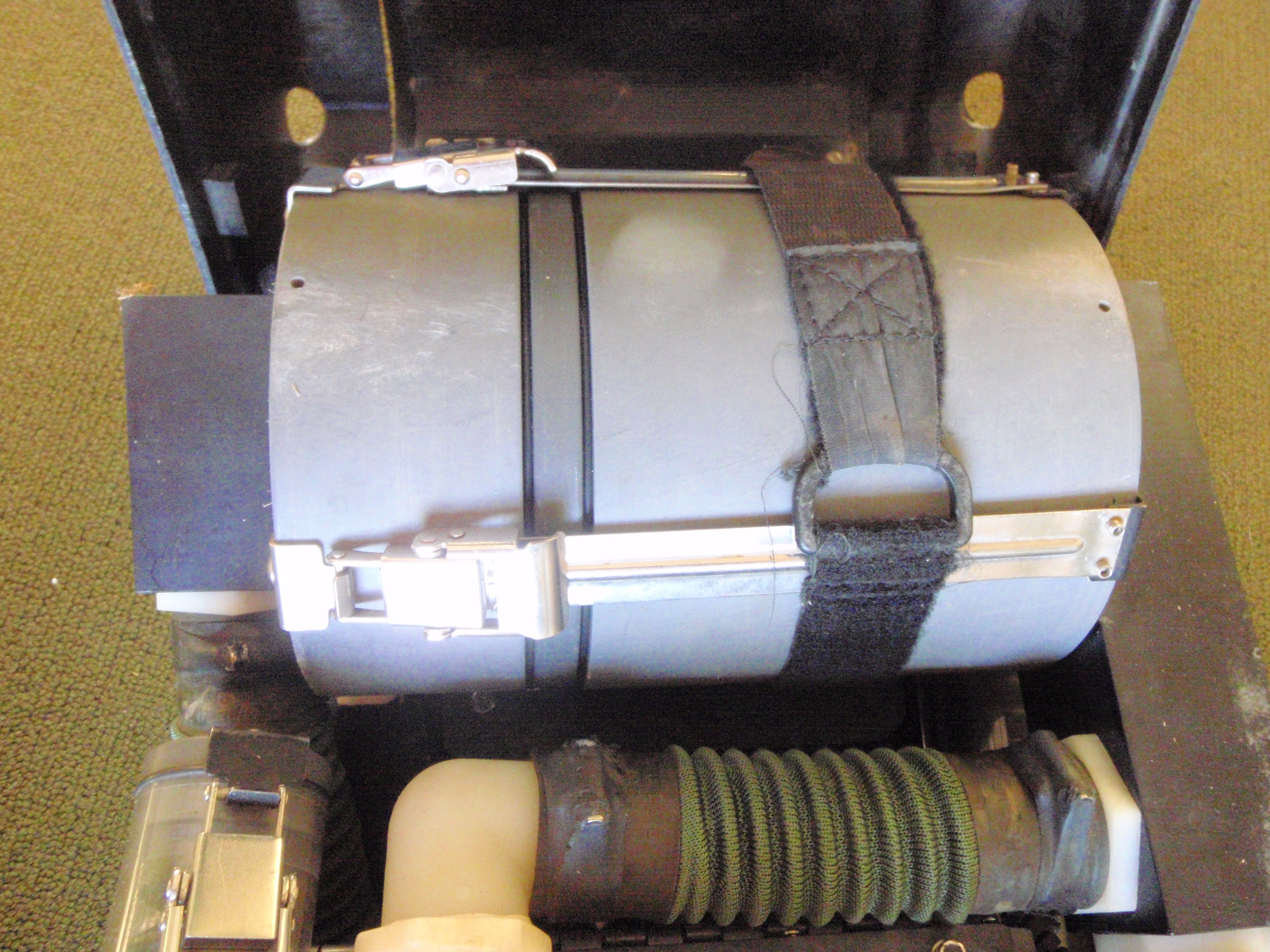
Halcyon PVR-BASC semi-closed circuit rebreather scrubber - assembled and mounted

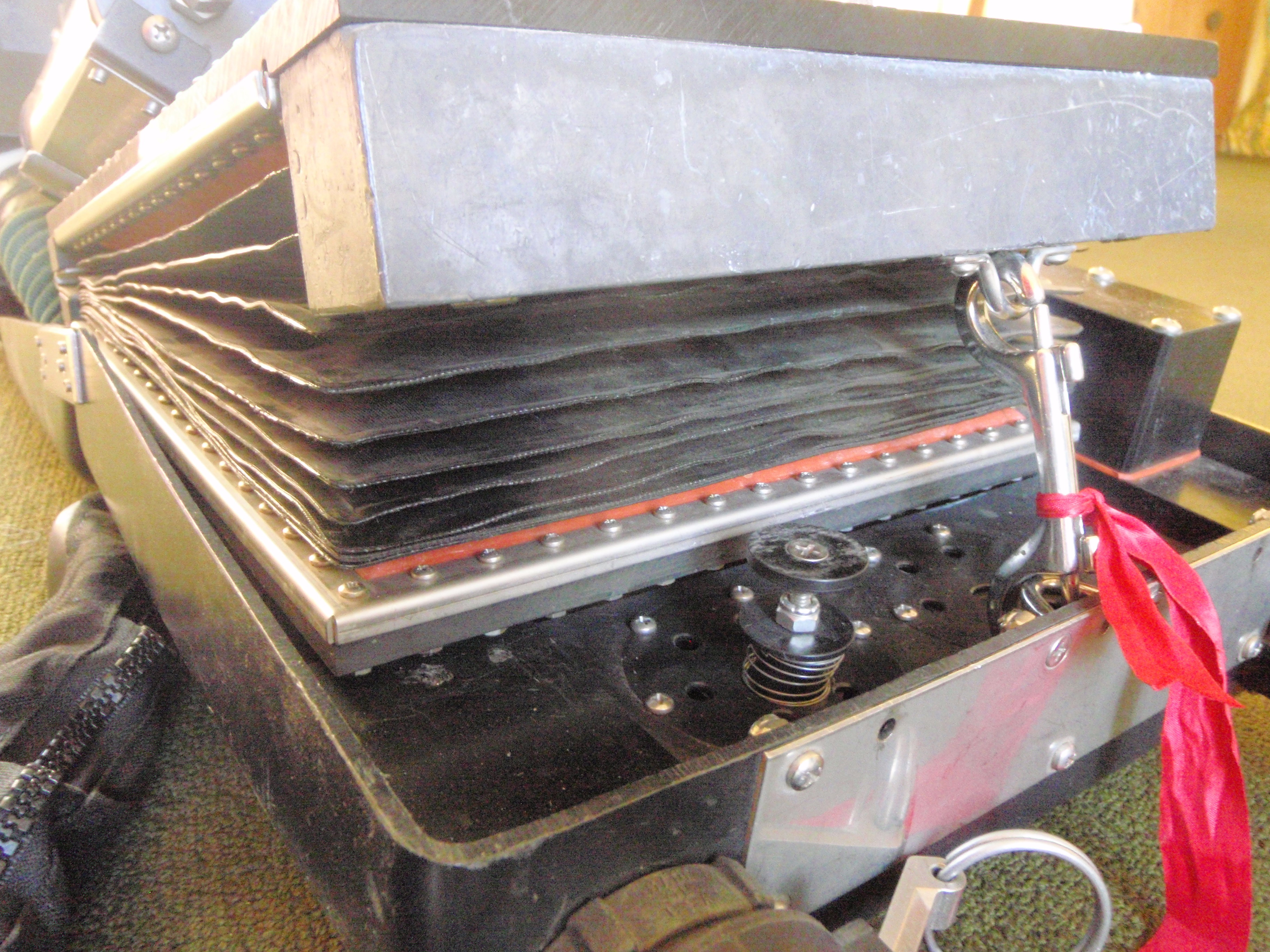
Halcyon PVR-BASC semi-closed circuit rebreather - bellows counterlung

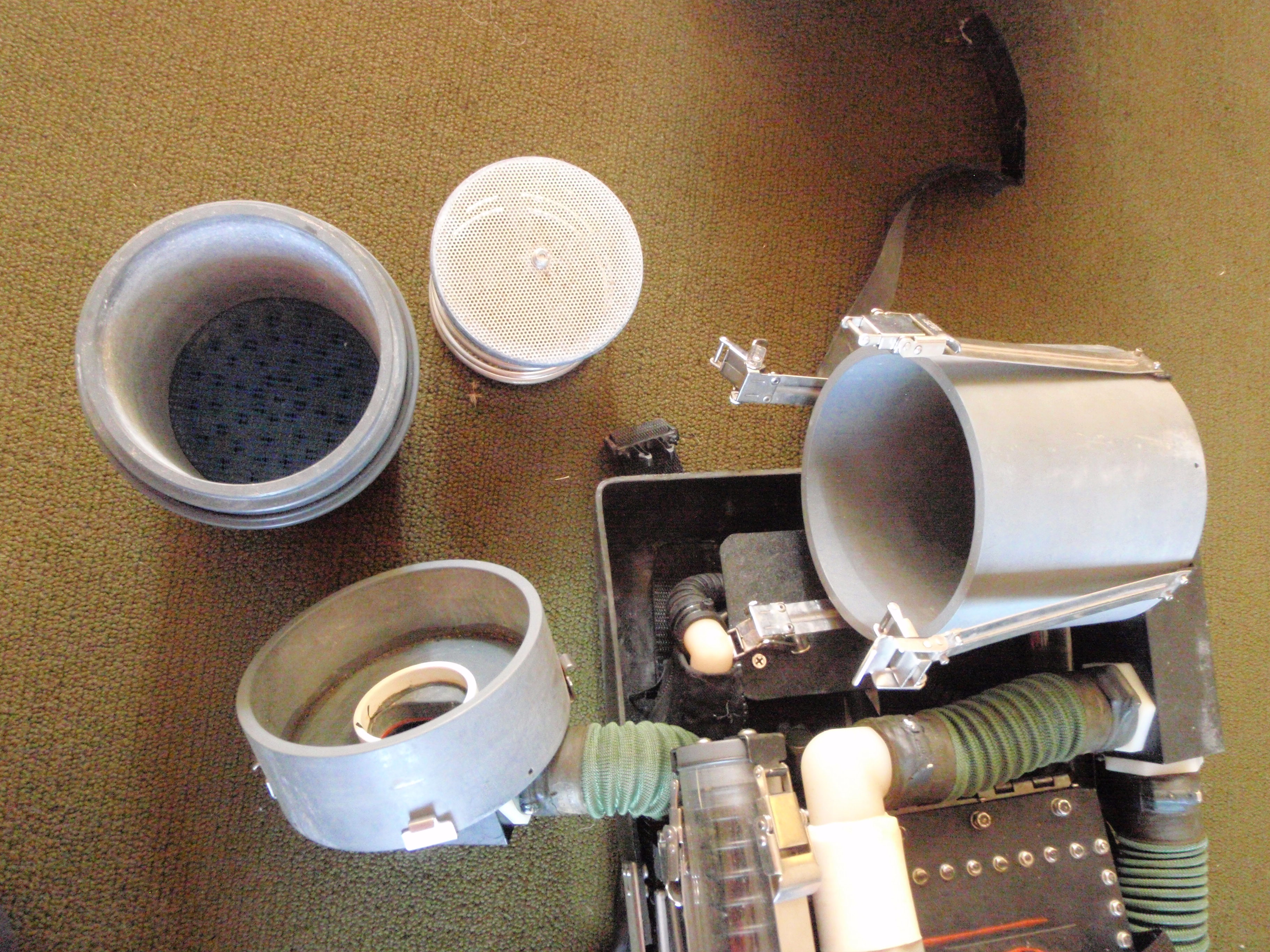
Halcyon PVR-BASC semi-closed circuit rebreather scrubber components

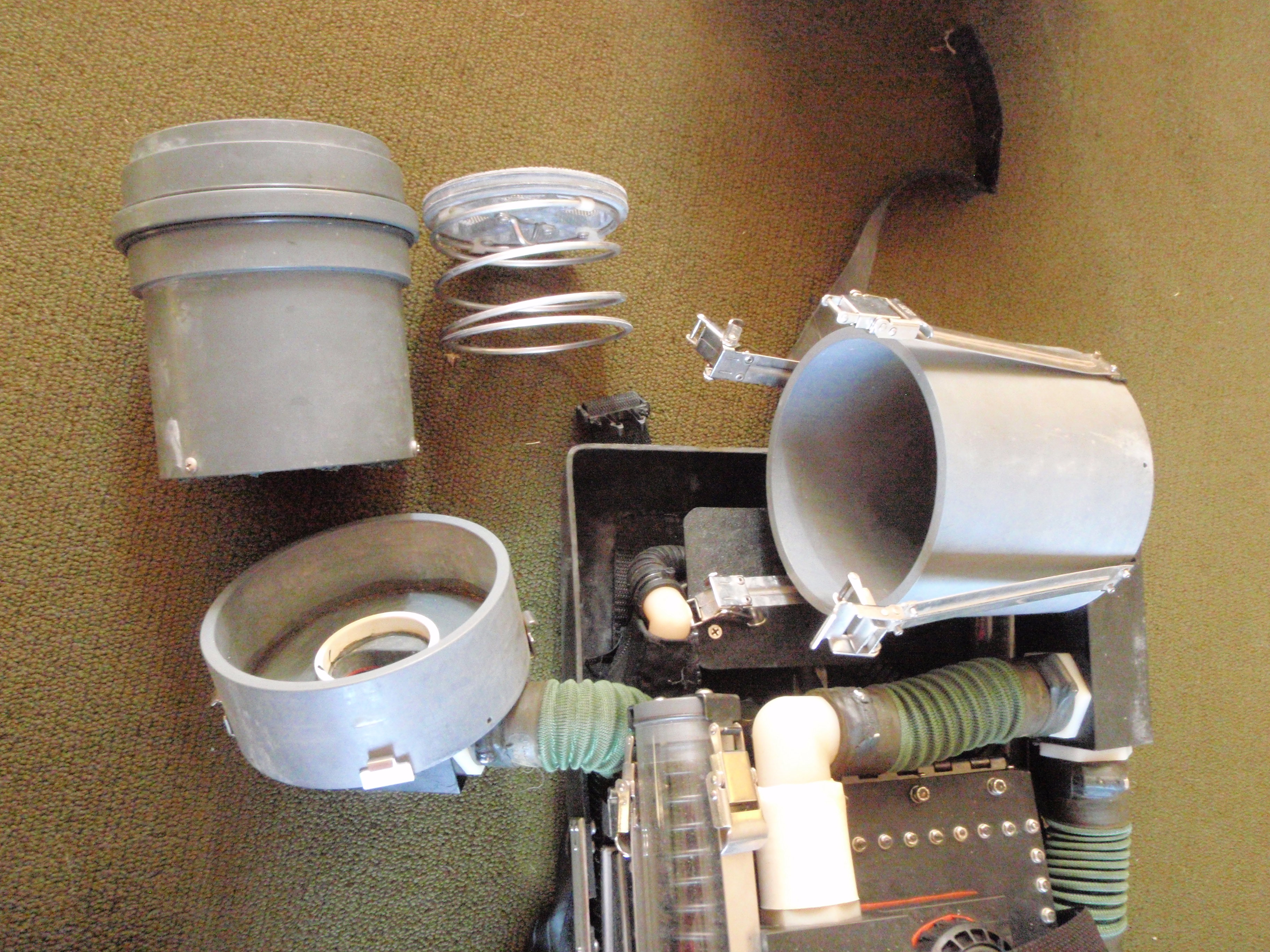
Halcyon PVR-BASC semi-closed circuit rebreather - Scrubber internal components

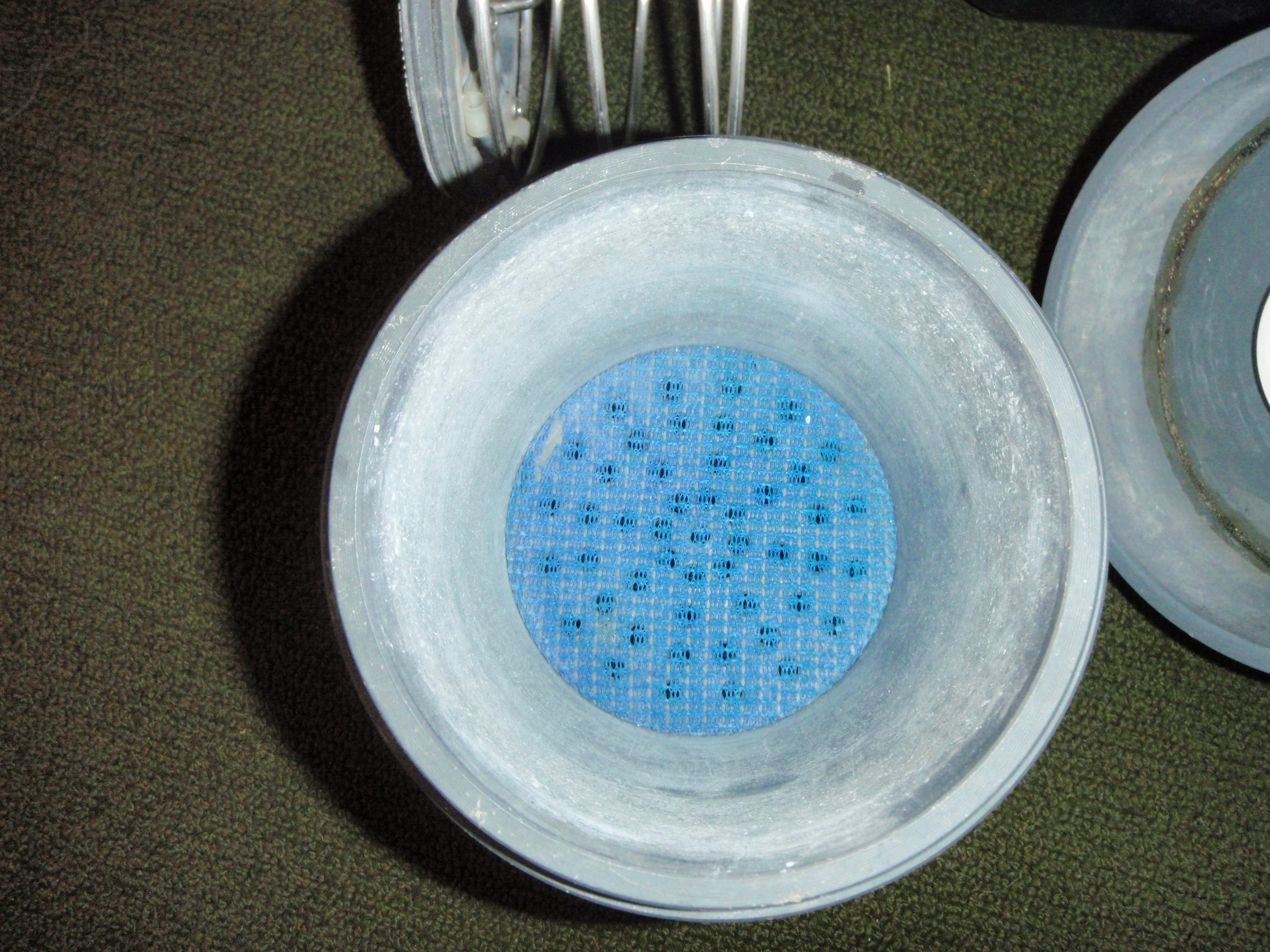
Halcyon PVR-BASC semi-closed circuit rebreather absorbent canister

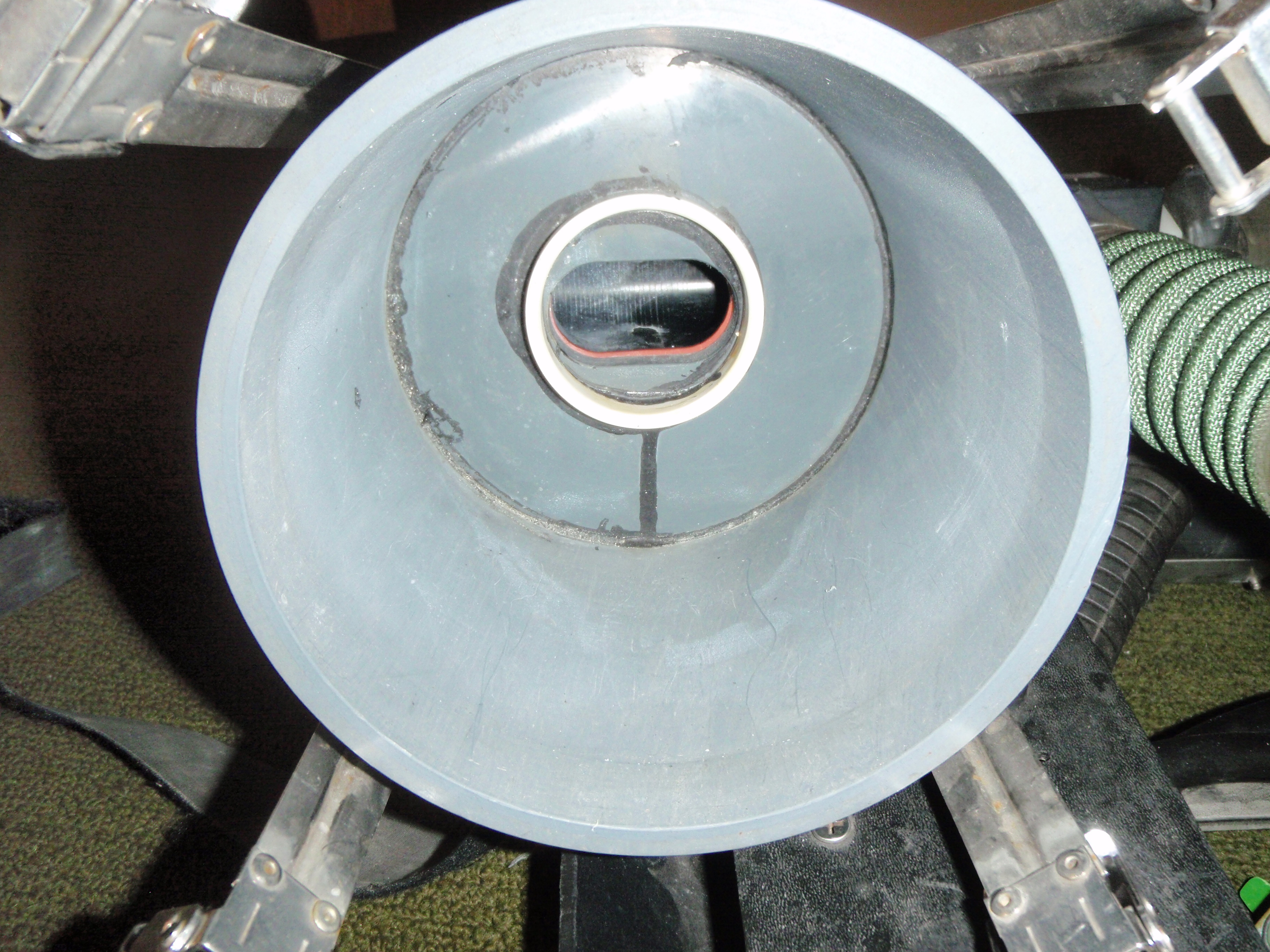
Halcyon PVR-BASC semi-closed circuit rebreather scrubber casing interior and secondary water trap

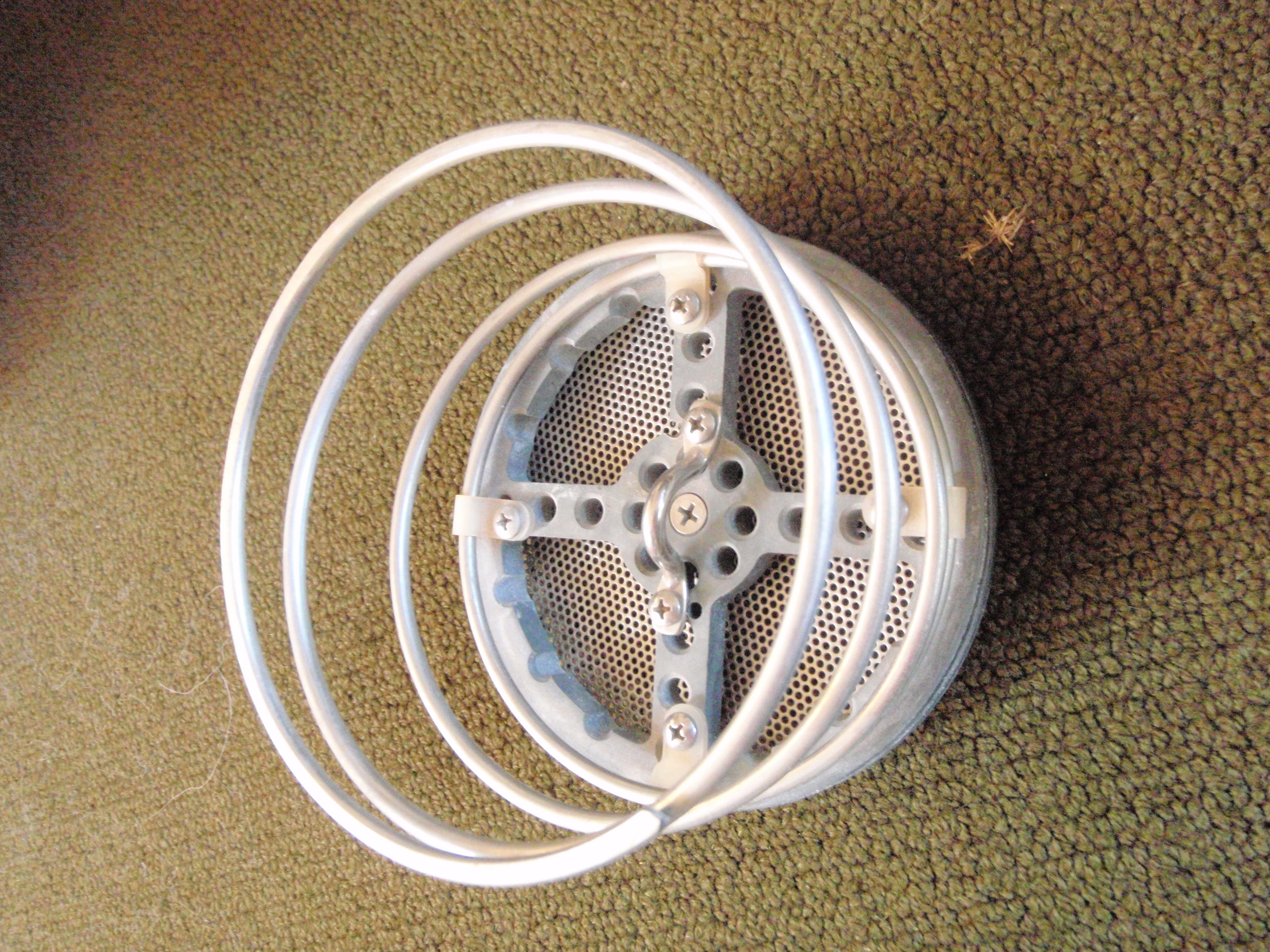
Halcyon PVR-BASC semi-closed circuit rebreather - scrubber medium retaining screen and spring

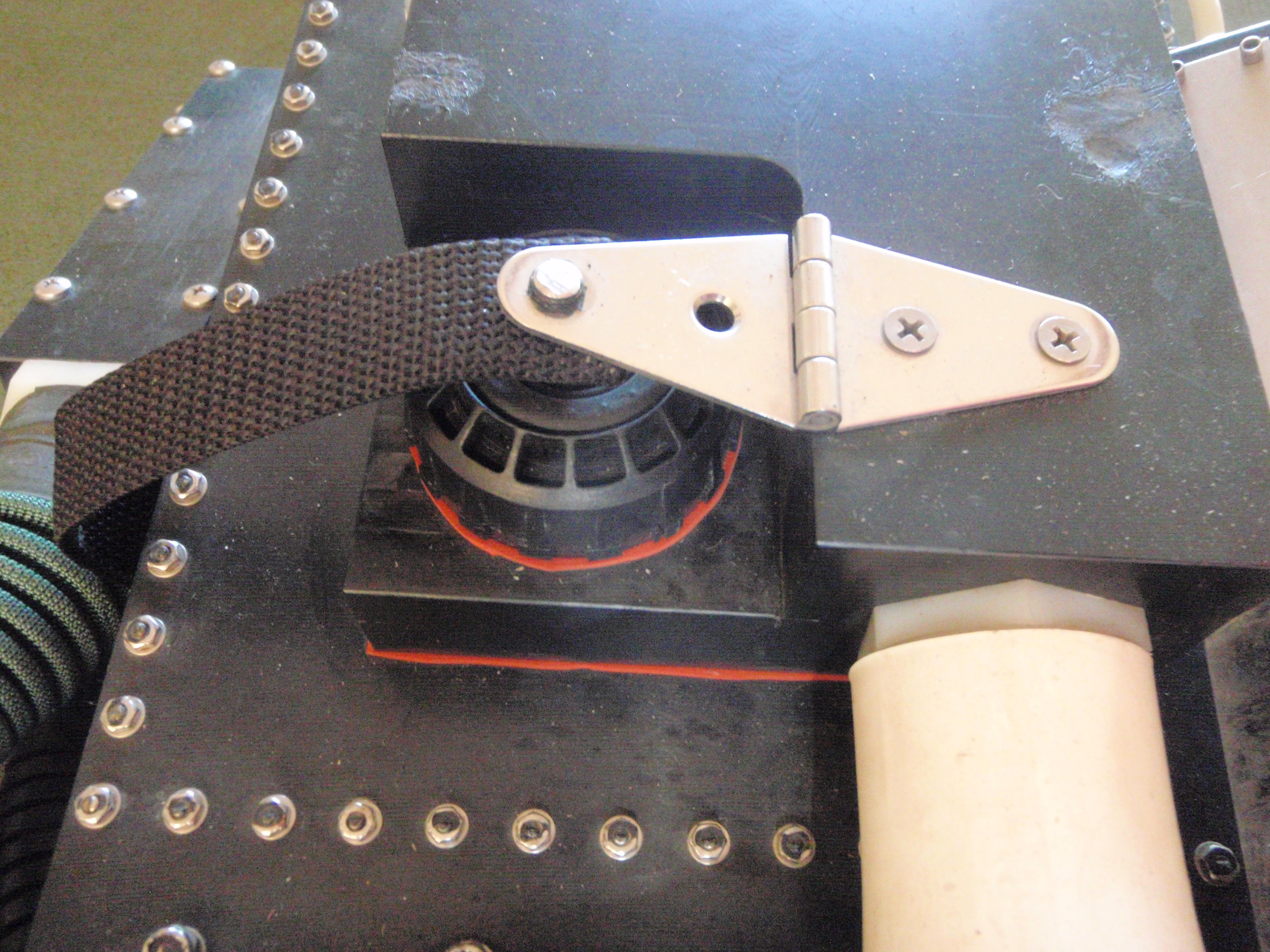
Halcyon PVR-BASC semi-closed circuit rebreather - overpressure dump valve

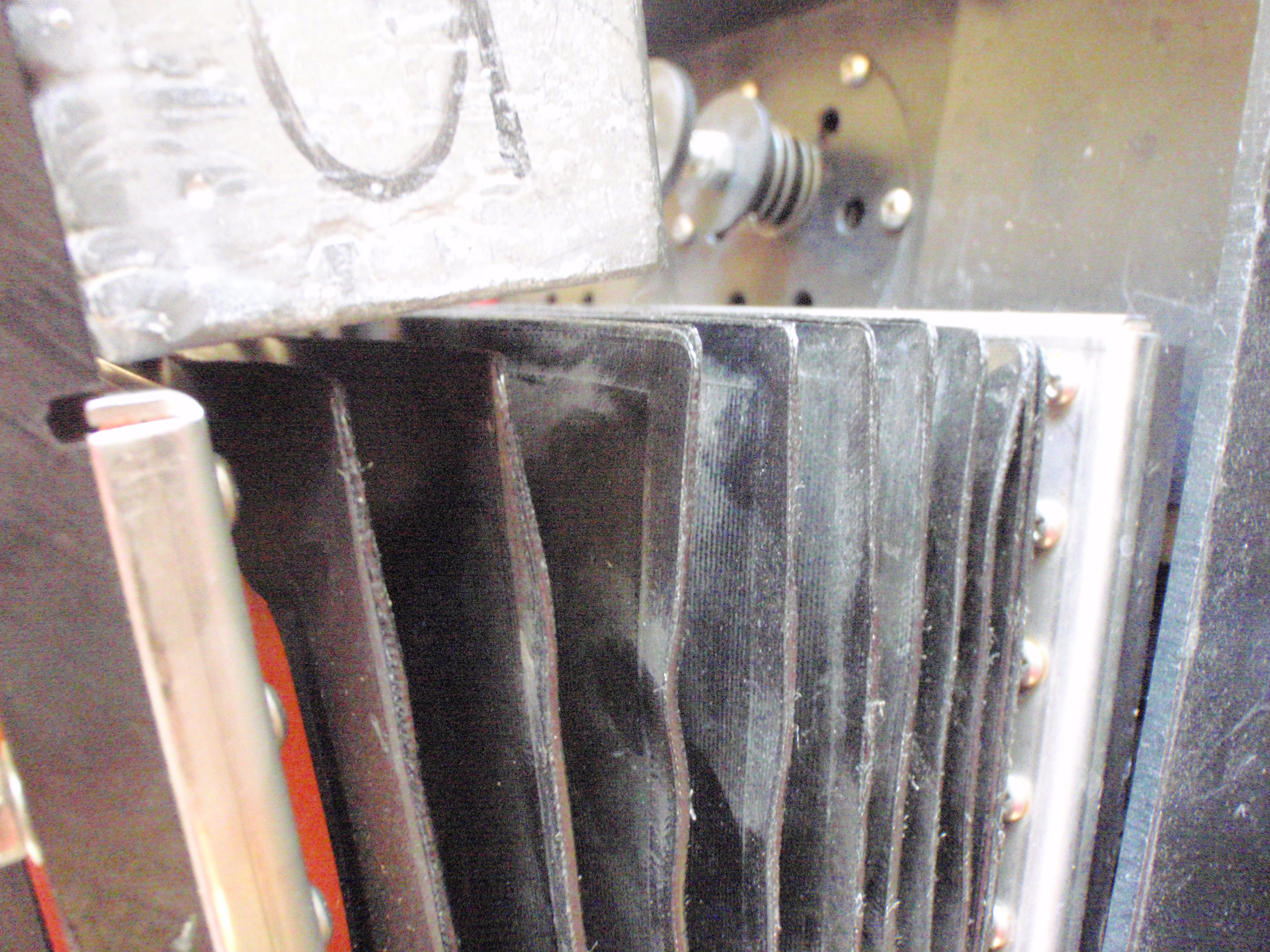
Halcyon PVR-BASC semi-closed circuit rebreather - bellows counterlung detail

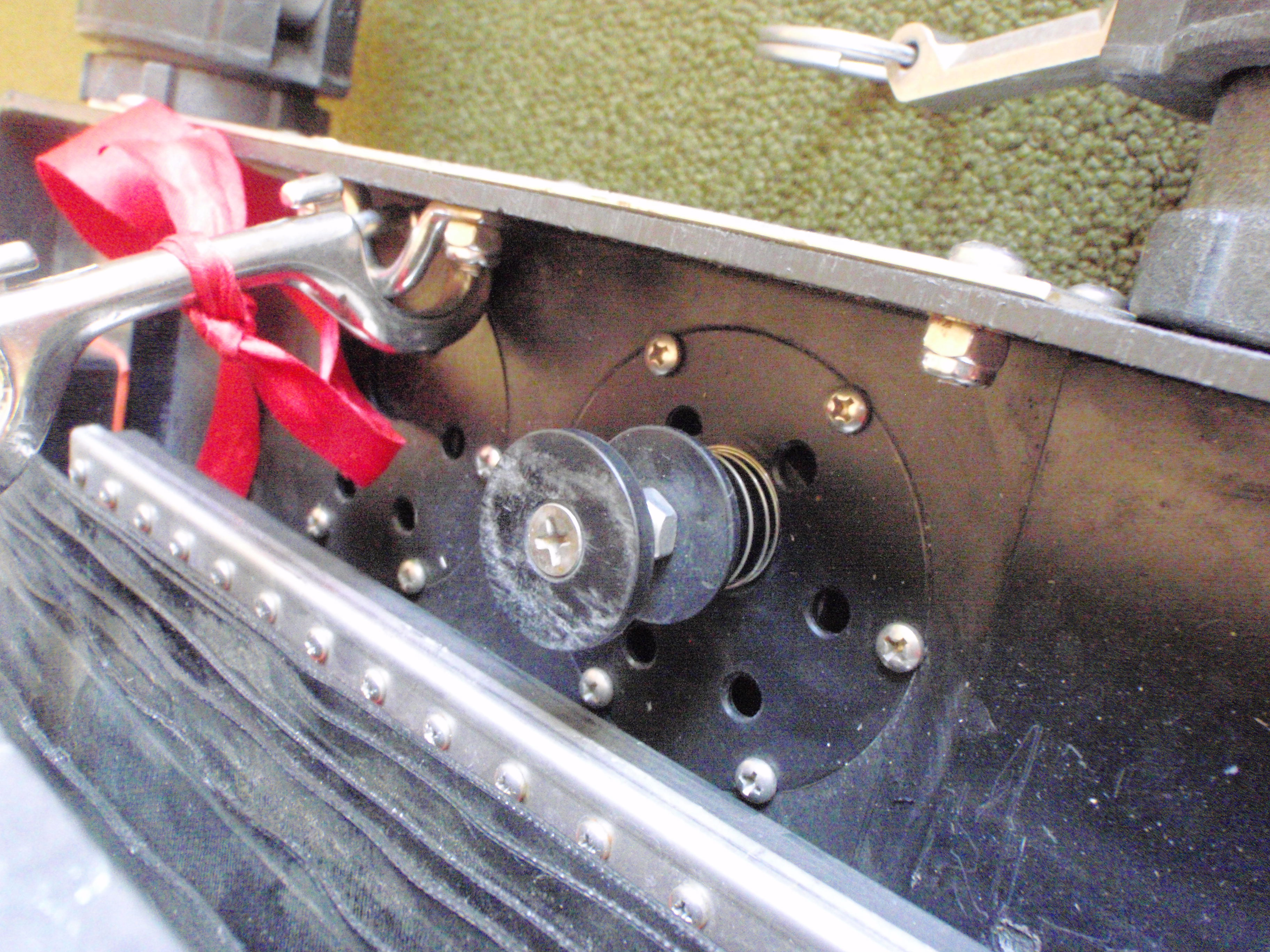
Halcyon PVR-BASC semi-closed circuit rebreather

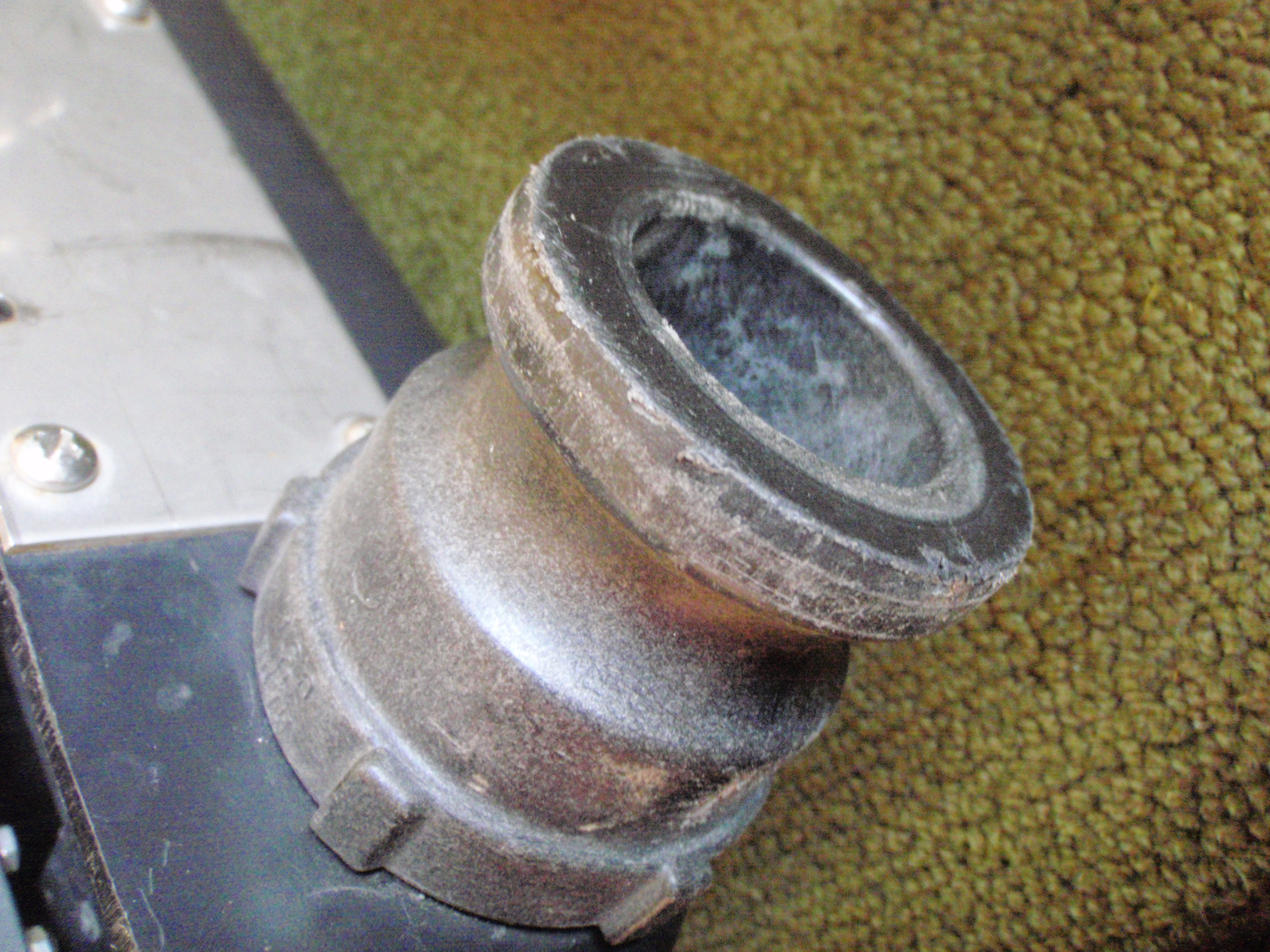
Halcyon PVR-BASC semi-closed rebreather. breathing hose connector

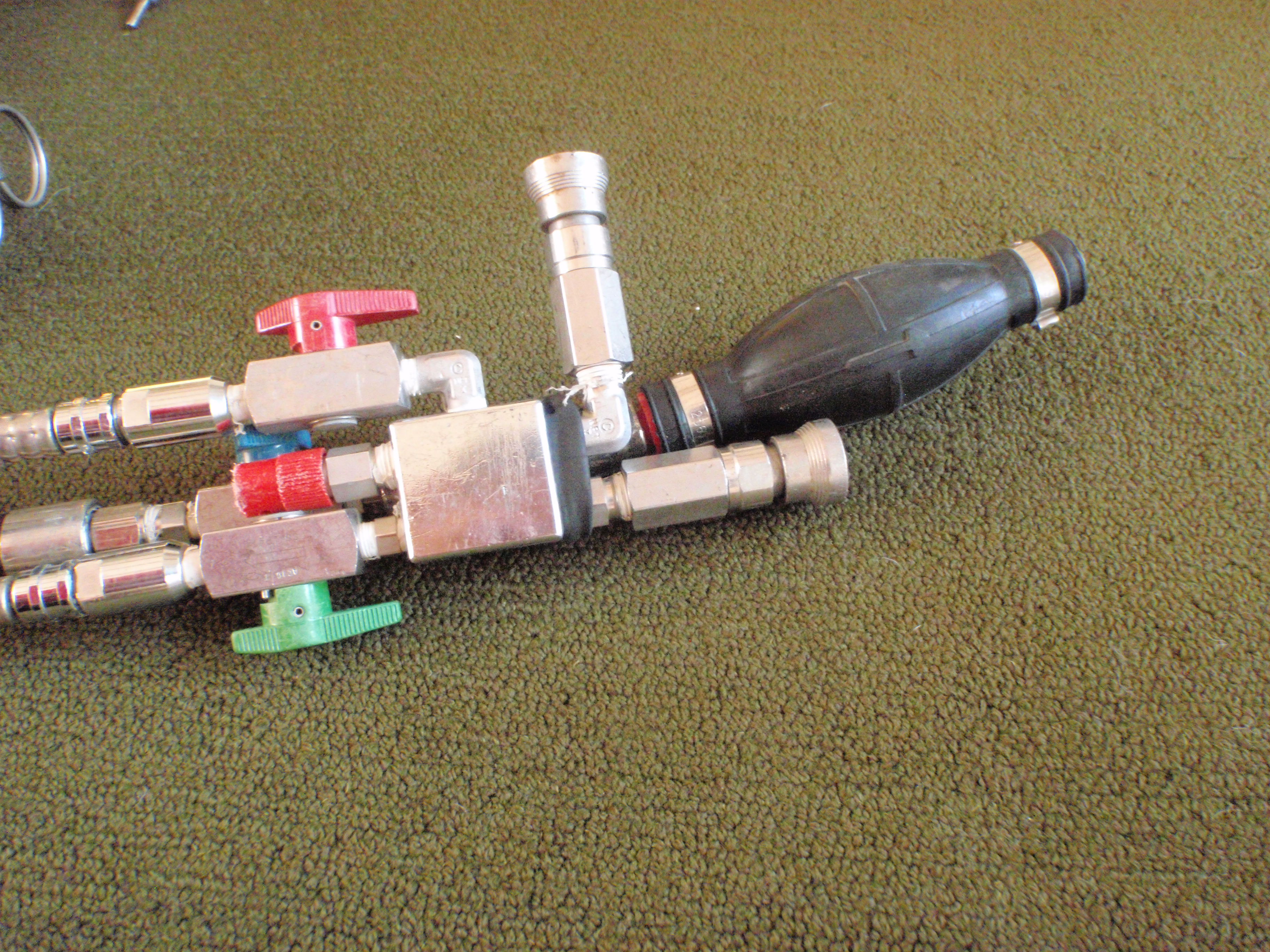
Halcyon PVR-BASC semi-closed rebreather Manual gas supply valves and loop drain pump

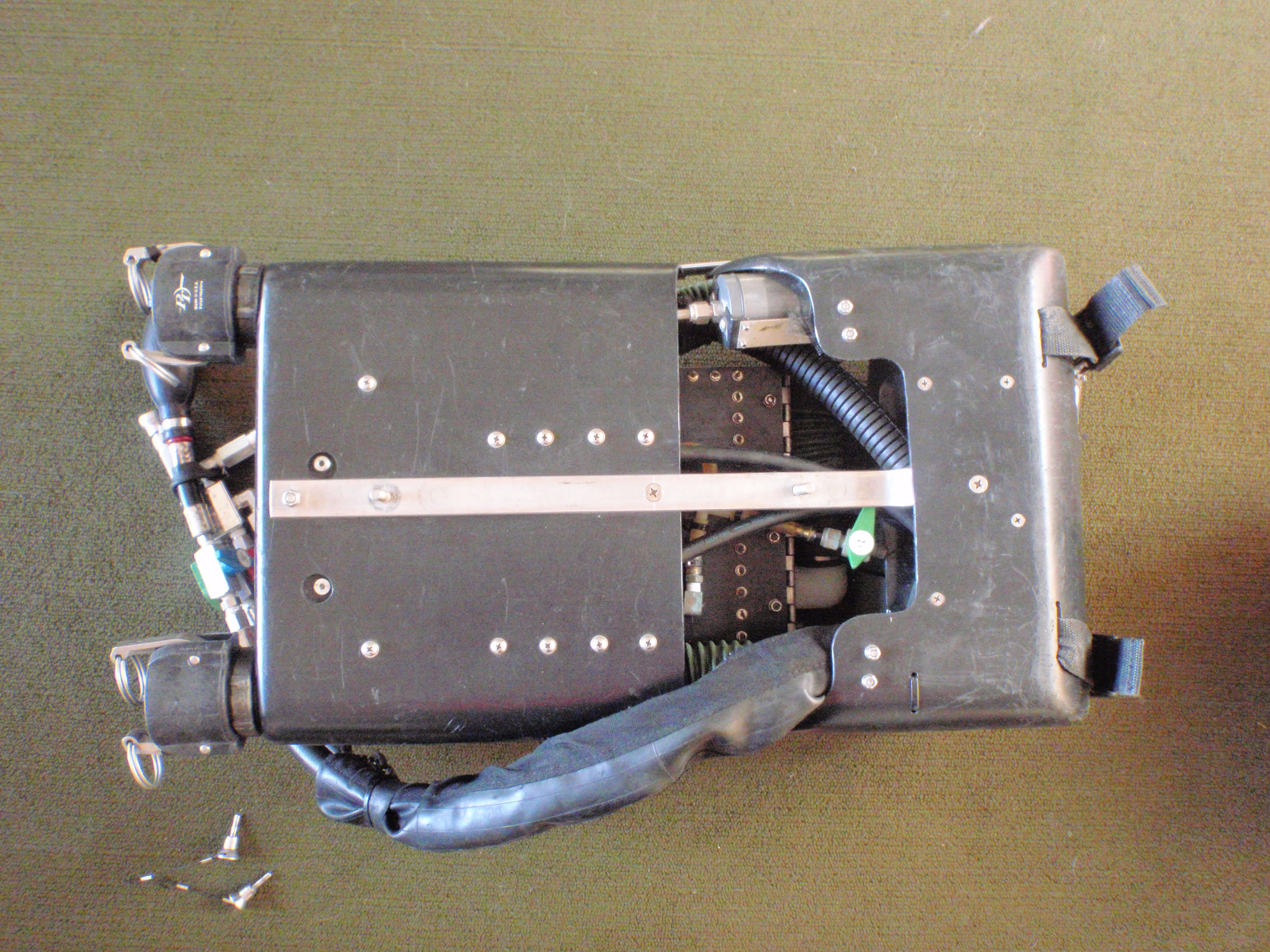
Halcyon PVR-BASC semi-closed rebreather - underside

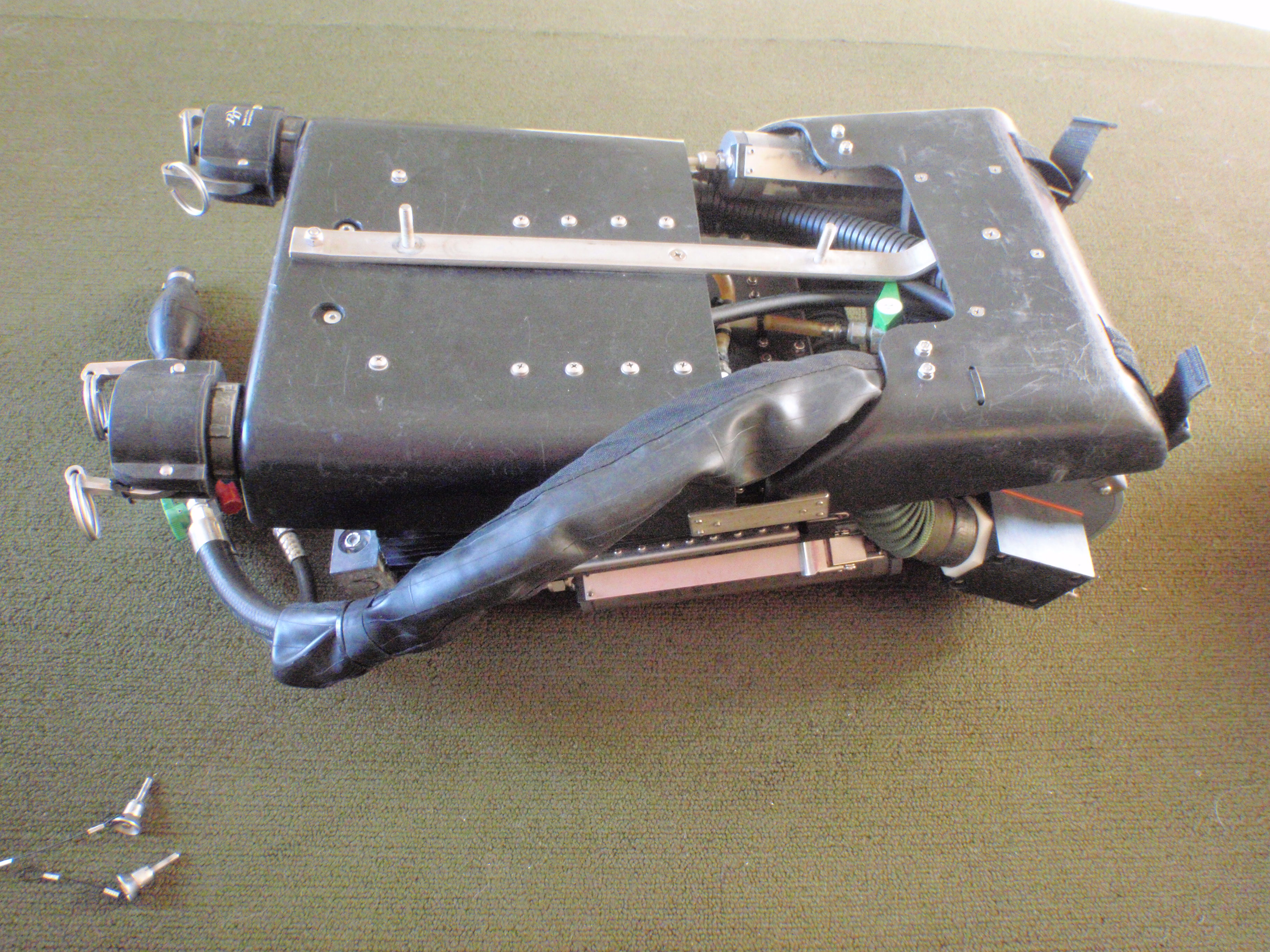
Halcyon PVR-BASC semi-closed rebreather - underside, showing gas supply connectors, hoses and manual valves, and loop drain pump

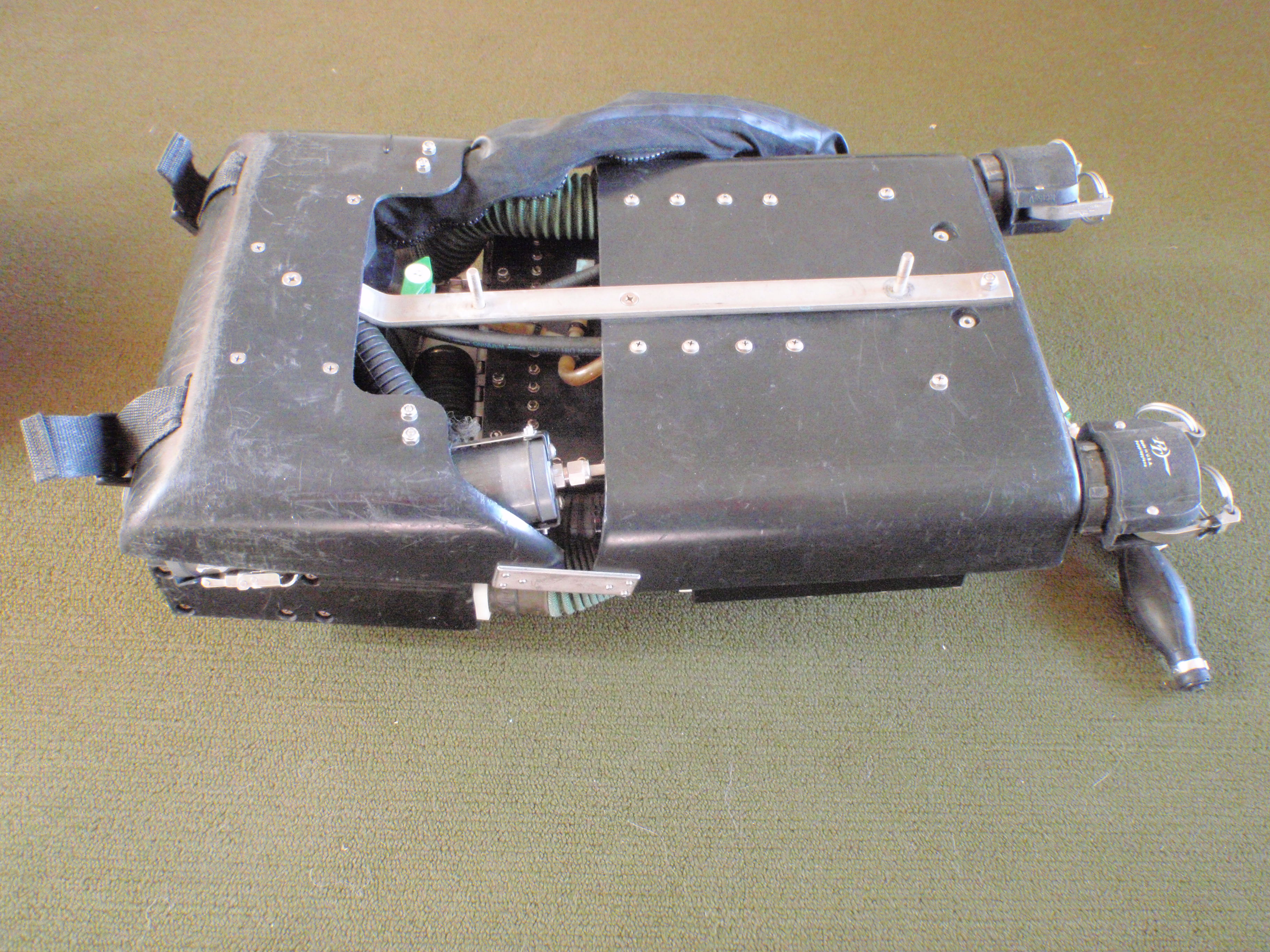
Halcyon PVR-BASC semi-closed rebreather underside, showing bolts for connection to backplate

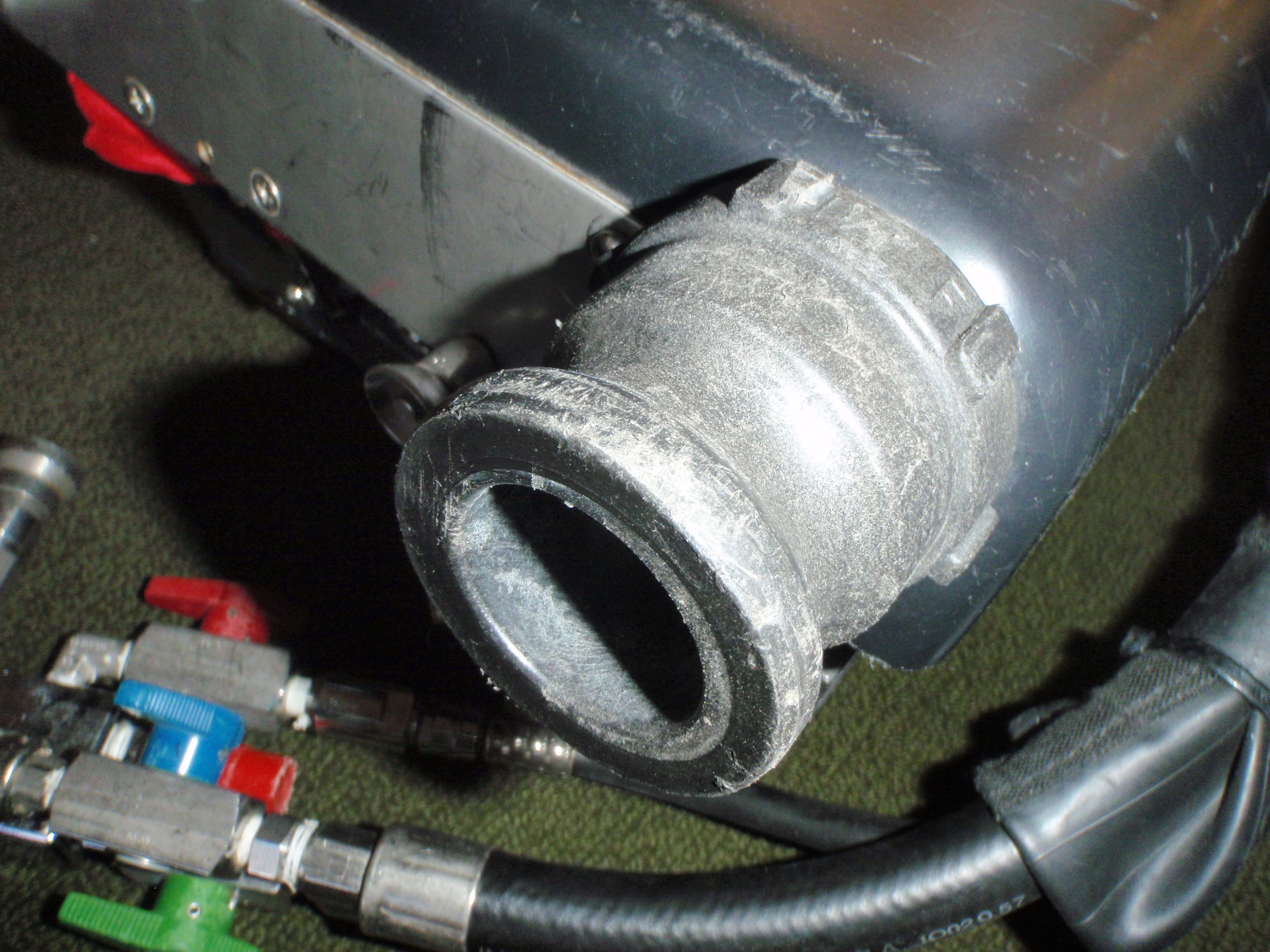
Halcyon PVR-BASC semi-closed rebreather breathing hose connector

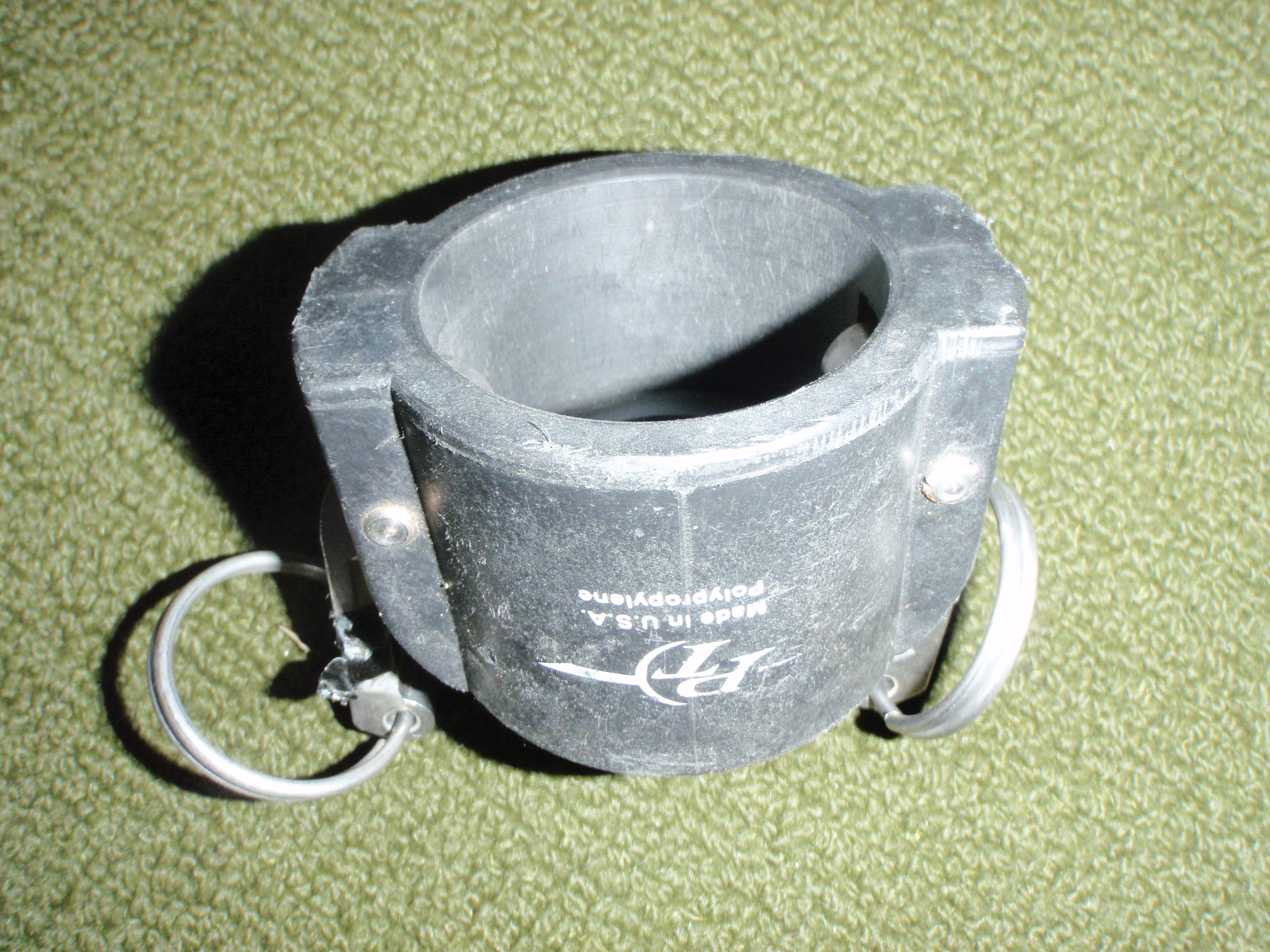
Halcyon PVR-BASC semi-closed rebreather. breathing hose connector cover
