= Mike Young (cave diver) =

American cave explorer and rebreather designer

- Occupation: Rebreather designer
- Years active: c. 1995–present
- Known for: Cave exploration; Rebreather inventions
- Website: kissrebreathers.com

Mike Young is an American cave diver and rebreather designer. He is known for record-breaking underwater cave exploration and is the former owner of KISS Rebreathers. Young designed the first production sidemount rebreather and the KISS Sidewinder, a sidemount rebreather popular among cave divers.

== Early life ==
Young grew up in Colorado. He learned to scuba dive in the 1990s and worked as a machinery designer and builder.

== Rebreather design ==
Young has designed multiple rebreathers including the KISS GEM and Spirit. In 2012, he became the owner of KISS Rebreathers and moved production to Fort Smith, Arkansas. The KISS Sidekick became the first production-made sidemount rebreather and won the TEKDiveUSA 2016 innovation award. The Sidewinder is a popular sidemount closed circuit rebreather (CCR) used by cave divers. Young sold the company in 2021 but continued to design rebreathers including the chest-mounted Dive Talk Go.

== Cave diving ==
Young has explored caves with the Advanced Diver Magazine Exploration team, US Deep Caving team, and KISS Rebreathers dive team. In 2011, Young mapped the longest known underground river system, a 14 mile (23 km) long system in Puerto Rico. In 2021, Young and Randall Purdy dove to 472 feet (144 m) in Roaring River Spring which was the deepest exploration of a US cave until 2023. The Missouri senate recognized the dive team for their exploration of the cave.

Young has participated in multiple body recoveries. In 2019 Young, along with Edd Sorenson, recovered the bodies of two divers in the Domincan Republic who had been stuck in a cave for weeks. Young also supported Sorenson's rescue of Josh Bratchley, a diver who had participated in the Tham Luang cave rescue.

Young is a CCR instructor and instructor trainer. He is an advisory member of the Professional Scuba Association International (PSAI).

=== In media ===
Young participated in diving Devils Hole Cave for the IMAX film Ancient Caves and to support research along with Brian Kakuk. Young is also featured leading a cave exploration team in Jonathan Bird's Blue World.
