= Side mount =

Side mount may refer to:

- Sidemount diving, a scuba diving equipment configuration
- Side control, a grappling technique
