= Kakuk =

Kakuk is a surname. Notable people with the surname include:

- Brian Kakuk (fl. from c. 1980), American cave diver and underwater photographer
- Zsuzsa Kakuk (1925–2025), Hungarian linguist and Turkologist
