= Edd Sorenson =

Cave diver from Florida

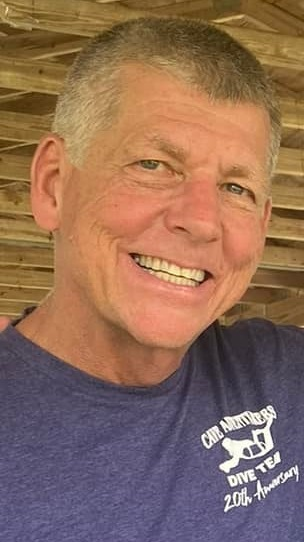
- Sorenson in 2023
- Born: 1959 (age 66–67); Portland, Oregon, US
- Occupations: Technical diving instructor, dive center owner
- Years active: 1995–present
- Known for: Cave diving, cave rescue
- Partner: Stacy Martin
- Awards: See section

Edd Sorenson (born 1959) is an American cave diver known for numerous rescues of lost or trapped divers in underwater caves, particularly in Florida's Vortex Spring and Blue Spring State Park. Sorenson has been credited as the only diver with multiple successful rescues in completely submerged caves. He is one of the most experienced body recovery divers in the world.

Sorenson is originally from Portland, Oregon and moved to Marianna, Florida where he founded Cave Adventurers dive center. He is known as an instructor for the KISS Sidewinder rebreather as well as having been instrumental in its development and testing. His students have included hosts of Jonathan Bird's Blue World and the YouTube channel "Dive Talk," with both programs having featured Sorenson. Sorenson has explored caves with Brian Kakuk.

== Career ==
Sorenson began diving in 1995 and within a few years expanded to cave diving. In 1999, he joined International Underwater Cave Rescue and Recovery (IUCRR) as one of the original members and in 2003 founded Cave Adventurers dive center in Marianna, Florida near Florida Caverns State Park. He is the safety director for the National Speleological Society Cave Diving Section (NSS-CDS).

Due to his experience with the Vortex Spring cave system, Sorenson was involved in the 2010 search for missing diver Ben McDaniel. After an extensive search, Sorenson believed that McDaniel was not trapped in the cave because of lack of evidence and disturbance to the cave commonly seen after a diver passes through. He stated, "The last place I searched was pristine, without a mark that a diver had been there. It would be impossible to go through that restriction without making a mark on the floor or ceiling. He's not in there."

In 2012, Sorenson completed four successful underwater cave rescues.

In February 2019 Sorenson, along with Mike Young, successfully conducted two body recoveries from Dudú Lagoon in the Dominican Republic.

In April 2019 Sorenson successfully rescued Josh Bratchley, a British cave diver who assisted in the rescue of 12 boys and their soccer coach from a Thai cave, from Mill Pond Cave in Flynn's Lick, Tennessee.

== Awards and recognition ==
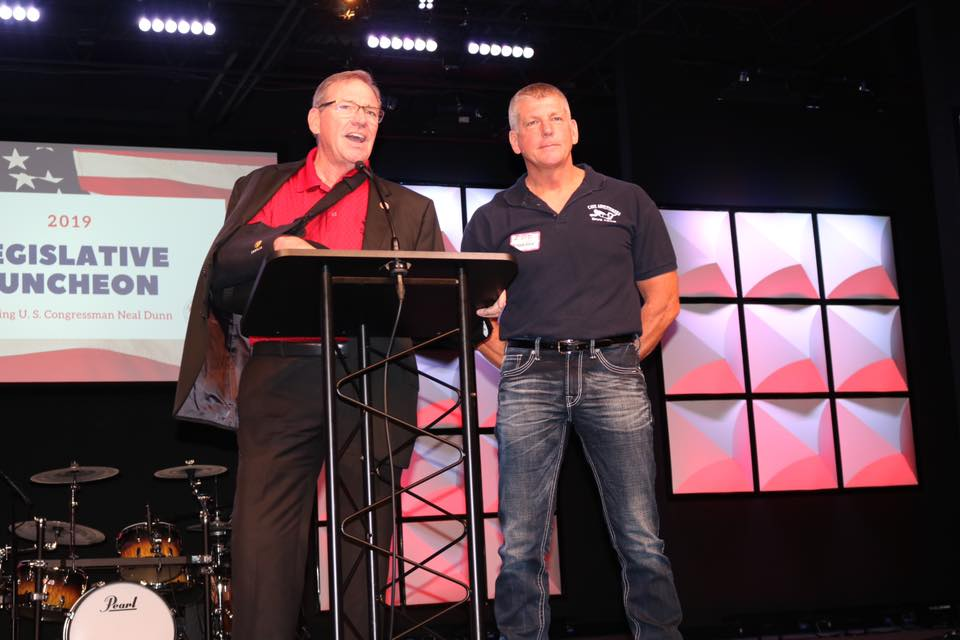
Congressman Neal Dunn recognizing Sorenson at a luncheon in Florida, 2019

For his efforts in 2012, Sorenson was awarded the Divers Alert Network Hero Award, Heroic Merit Awards and the Instructor Trainer of the Year from the Professional Scuba Association International (PSAI). He was featured in the Duracell series Quantum Heroes.

The NSS-CDS presented Sorenson with the Life Saving Award in 2013. In 2019, the organization presented him with the Lifetime Achievement Award. The “Edd Sorenson Life Saving Award” was named after him.

Sorenson received the NAUI Albert Pierce medal for heroism and the Lifesaving medal from the Royal Order of St. John.

Congressman Neal Dunn recognized Sorenson on the floor of the US House of Representatives for his rescues and recoveries.

== Personal life ==
Sorenson has said that he survived cancer in the 2020s.

== See also ==
- Tham Luang cave rescue – 2018 international rescue mission in Thailand
