= Brian Kakuk =

Cave diving explorer

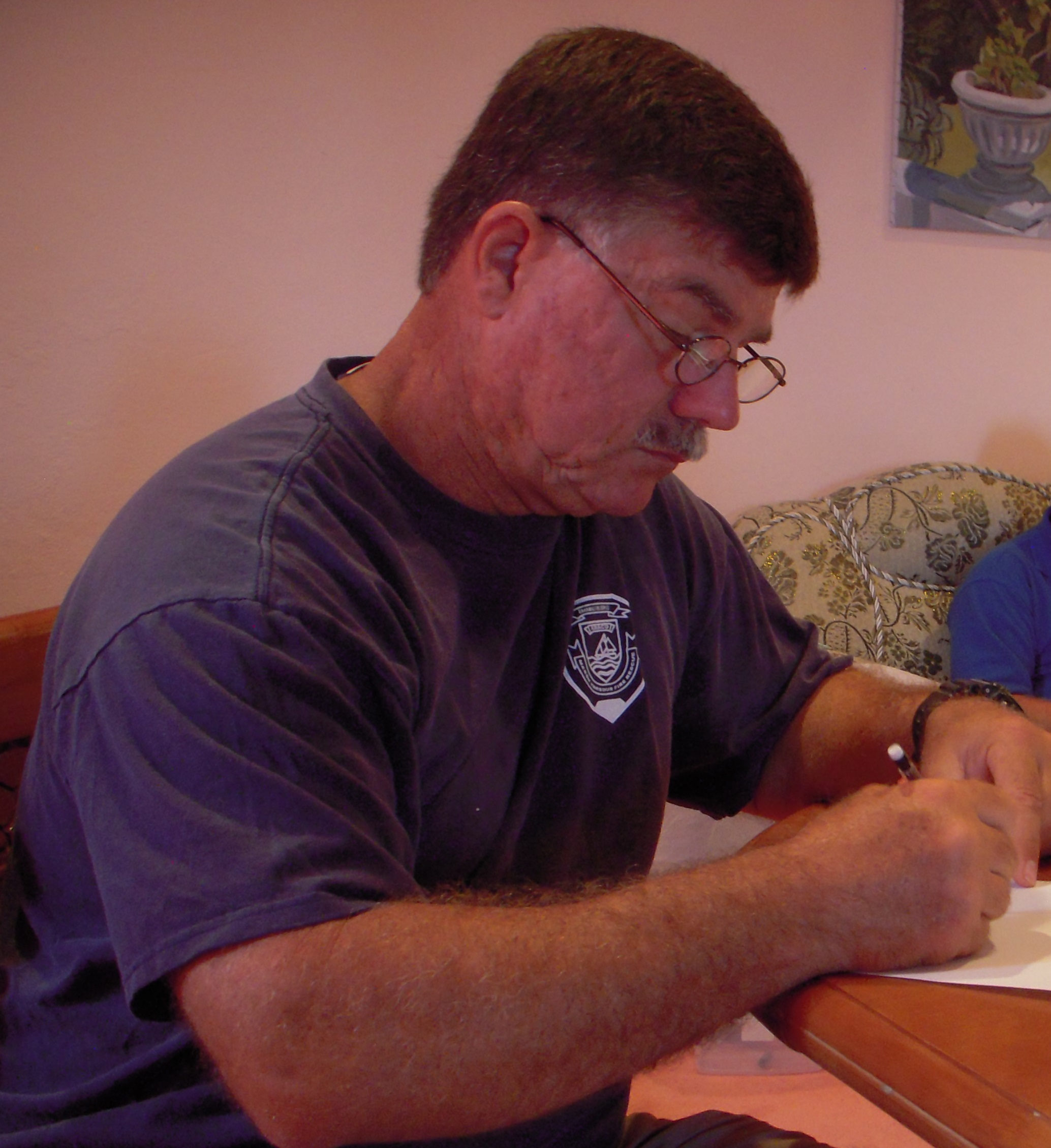
- Kakuk in 2011
- Occupations: Cave diving guide; technical diving instructor; dive safety officer
- Years active: c.1980–present
- Known for: Underwater cave exploration and preservation
- Military career
- Branch: United States Navy
- Service years: 7
- Website: bahamasunderground.com bahamascaves.com

Brian Kakuk is a cave diver known for underwater cave exploration and preservation efforts in the Bahamas, where he has lived since 1988.

Kakuk has dived professionally for over 40 years, conducted over 3000 exploration dives, and laid "hundreds of thousands of feet of line." He is the founder and director of the Bahamas Caves Research Foundation and co-owner and operator of Bahamas Underground dive center.

== Early life ==
Kakuk is originally from Goleta, California and took swim and snorkeling classes as a child. He completed Junior Frogman Ranger and Blue Sharks courses through Los Angeles County Parks and Recreation.

== Career ==
Kakuk served as a US Navy diver for seven years in the 1980s. His work included salvage and underwater seacraft repair. He subsequently worked as a civilian contract diver in the Bahamas.

Kakuk has worked as the dive safety officer for the Caribbean Marine Research Center. He was featured as the chief science diver and diver in charge of safety for the Nova episode "Extreme Cave Diving." Producer James Barrat referred to Kakuk as "probably the planet's premier science and cave diver." Kakuk performed dive safety for films including installments of the Pirates of the Caribbean series. He has supported work for the BBC, National Geographic, and Japan's NHK.

Divers Jill Heinerth, Wes Skiles, and Edd Sorenson have conducted exploration missions with Kakuk. Kakuk is an advanced cave instructor trainer and co-authored Side Mount Profiles with Heinerth. Jonathan Bird's Blue World features Kakuk as Bird's cave diving instructor and Kakuk supported Bird's IMAX film Ancient Caves along with Mike Young. Kakuk serves as the Caribbean coordinator for International Underwater Cave Rescue and Recovery.

== Research and preservation efforts ==
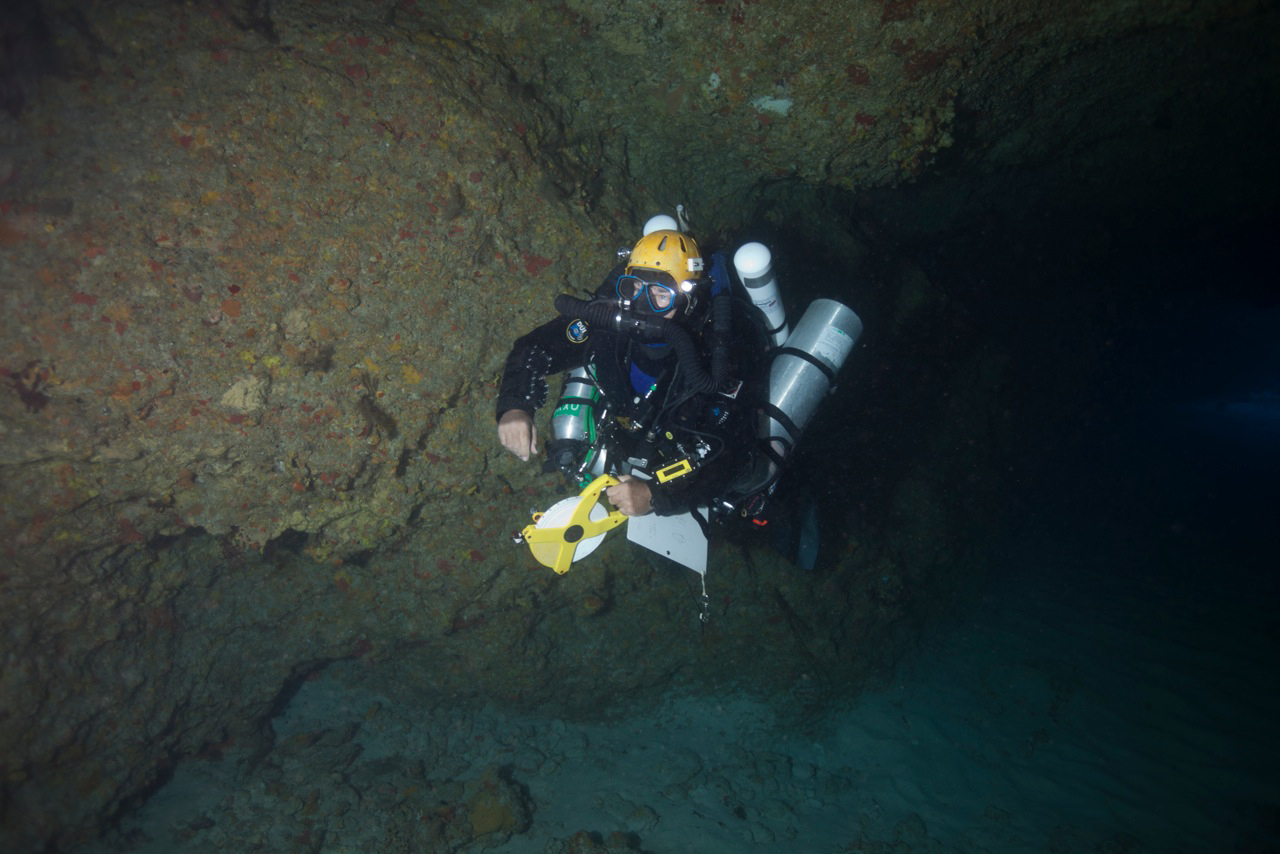
Kakuk diving for NOAA Bermuda Deep Water Caves 2011 Exploration

Kakuk founded the Bahamas Caves Research Foundation (BCRF) in the 1990s. He has campaigned for the protection of caves known as blue holes in the Abaco Islands with the goal of forming an underwater national park. In 2019, the South Abaco Blue Holes Conservation Area was designated. Kakuk has assisted researchers, discovered over a dozen animal species, and has four microscopic animals named after him.

In 2005 at Sawmill Sink, Kakuk discovered remnants of tortoises and crocodiles which were extinct on Abaco. His discoveries, combined with support from geologist Nancy Albury and curator David Steadman, led to the creation of a natural history museum branch in 2018. The museum was destroyed by Hurricane Dorian in 2019.

Kakuk is a fellow of The Explorers Club.
