= International Underwater Cave Rescue and Recovery =

Cave diving rescue/recovery organization

- Abbreviation: IUCRR
- Established: 1999; 27 years ago
- Founders: Henry Nicholson; Robert Laird
- Type: Not-for-profit
- Headquarters: Florida, US
- Fields: Scuba rescue
- Director: Mark Fowler
- Website: iucrr.org

International Underwater Cave Rescue and Recovery (IUCRR) is an all-volunteer not-for-profit organization formed in 1999 that provides assistance to law enforcement with underwater rescue and recovery operations.

The team consists of U.S. and international coordinators (Regional Coordinators; as specified on the IUCRR website) and first responders who are trained in the incident command system. When called upon, they will work with local law enforcement to develop a rescue or recovery plan and coordinate with qualified recovery divers. The divers must be certified and must be qualified to dive in the specific environment where the rescue or recovery is taking place. IUCRR provides services in the U.S. and internationally, and has performed body recoveries throughout the world, as well as underwater cave rescues.

The IUCRR have established standard recovery procedures for cave diving fatalities, and may provide expertise and resources not easily available to most law-enforcement agencies. The IUCRR team members are taught to treat every recovery as a potential crime scene. They are certified in these procedures by cave diver training agencies, independently of the IUCRR, though the instructors themselves may be IUCRR members. Search and recoveries and rescues are coordinated with the law enforcement official on site. Although many law enforcement organizations have public safety divers, they are typically not trained for anything other than open water diving. The IUCRR assist by way of regional coordinators who organise the cave trained and experienced volunteer divers who perform the overhead diving portion of a rescue or recovery. Also, it is generally expected that the IUCRR provides public reports of incidents, some of which are archived on the IUCRR website. Incident reports are published when available, but the IUCRR makes no judgments about the cause of an incident.

== Notable members ==
- Brian Kakuk – Caribbean coordinator known for dive safety and cave exploration
- Edd Sorenson – Florida panhandle coordinator with multiple successful rescues
- Richard Harris – Australian coordinator and anaesthesiologist who participated in the Tham Luang cave rescue

== See also ==
- Cave diving#Safety
