= KISS Rebreathers =

Brand of recreational diving rebreathers

KISS Rebreathers is a brand of diving rebreathers marketed to the technical and recreational diving community. Originally manufactured in Canada, later in the US, the manufacturer has been owned by a European company since 2024, and is seeking CE accreditation for their latest product, the KISS Sidewinder 2. Most of their products are manually controlled closed circuit rebreathers (mCCRs) and semi-closed circuit rebreathers (SCRs) with rugged and generally user-serviceable construction.

== History ==
The original KISS rebreathers were designed, developed, and built in British Columbia, Canada, by Gordon Smith, a tool and die maker from Manitoba. The first version was built in 1995, with the first sales to the public in 1999. After Smith died in 2006, the business was run by Kim Mikusch until 2012, at which time Mike Young bought the company and operations were moved to Arkansas, in the US. During this time the product range was expanded to include more models of mCCR, while retaining the later model of the original back mount KISS as the KISS Classic. Additional models include the Kiss Spirit, a lightweight back mount mCCR, KISS Sidekick, a sidemount SCR/mCCR, KISS Sidewinder, a lightweight sidemount mCCR, and the KISS GEM, a compact back mount SCR, or gas extender.

In 2022 Kiss Rebreathers was purchased by Darkwater Group to develop and market an improved version of the Sidewinder, to be known as the KISS Sidewinder 2, which was to be CE certified for the European market.

As Gordon Smith's intentions were initially restricted to diving from his own boat with other divers of his choosing he was able to develop these experimental devices without the limitations of regulatory considerations.

The first attempt in 1998 was a novel approach, with pistons in cylinders serving as counterlungs rather than the conventional flexible bags. The approach was intended to use tank pressure to compensate for the o-ring friction and inertia of the displacing water. Although the o-ring friction in air was acceptable, the model could not handle the inertia of the necessary water displacement. The prototype suffered from excessive work of breathing, but it got him started. The next prototype was also a semi-closed design, but with more conventional flexible bag counterlungs, which worked successfully, and was dived for several months. With the experience gained with the semi-closed designs, he saw that a fully closed system was feasible and more desirable in terms of performance. He saw the merit of including an oxygen sensor due to the risk of inadvertent hypoxia if required to exercise at the surface. One of his early innovations was the bailout-integrated mouthpiece, for switching immediately to diluent for short term open-circuit operation in an emergency or even just upon entering the water. He also incorporated an automatic diluent valve to prevent below ambient loop pressure should the counterlungs become fully deflated during descent.

KISS Rebreathers are named for the KISS principle - A design philosophy that simplicity of design is often more reliable, as there is less to go wrong and it is often easier to fix.

KISS Rebreathers is a founding member of the Rebreather Education and Safety Association, (RESA), an organisation formed to improve safety and education in the rebreather industry.

== Classic ==
The KISS Classic is a fairly conventional architecture back mounted manually controlled closed circuit rebreather (mCCR) which uses two back mounted counterlungs which are available in 2 and 4 litre sizes, and can be used in any combination to best suit the diver's lung capacity. The counterlungs fit in a low profile casing on the backplate, which keeps them close to the diver to limit work of breathing, and the backplates are supported by a conventional tech harness of 2" webbing or similar. The model has been in production since 1999, with several upgrades. The centreline mounted axial flow scrubber with a central tube carries 6.4 lb of fine (8 to 12 mesh) Sofnolime or 5.5 lb of coarser (4 to 6 mesh) Draegersorb. Two cylinders, for oxygen and diluent, are strapped to the sides of the scrubber, with the cylinder valves and regulator first stages down, where it is easy to reach the valve knobs.

== Spirit ==
The KISS Spirit, also known as Orca Spirit, is a lightweight, low profile (150mm) back mount mCCR with split scrubbers, transverse mounted oxygen cylinder, and off-board diluent. There are two counterlung bags, which lie close to the diver's back under the buoyancy compensator wing.

== Sidekick ==
The KISS Sidekick is a lightweight sidemount rebreather intended for use when a low profile or demountability is necessary to pass through tight restrictions, and for use with another rebreather as a bailout set. The Sidekick is a small unit. Without the loop hoses it is 21.25 inches (540 mm) long and 7.25 inches (184 mm) diameter. It can be configured as an SCR (gas extender) or mCCR for primary or bailout use.

The layout is unusual in that the scrubber canister is mounted inside the single counterlung, which is mounted inside a stainless steel protective housing/frame suitable for rough handling and use as a bailout rebreather. The unit's buoyancy fluctuates between slightly positive and slightly negative over the breathing cycle, and the air space in the counterlung provides thermal insulation for the scrubber, which improves absorbent reaction rates. The scubber holds 5.2 pounds (2.4 kg) of Sofnolime, and the packed weight of the unit is 22.2 pounds (10.1 kg) in air. The canister can optionally be packed with a 5 inches (130 mm) diameter Micropore scrubber cartridge.

== GEM ==
The GEM is a semi-closed rebreather which uses only one source of breathing gas, and works as a 3:1 gas extender, giving the diver the facility to re-use the gas to more effectively utilise the oxygen content before discarding the gas. The minimum oxygen fraction authorised is 32%, and richer mixes may be used, with a shallower depth limitation. Additional benefits include warmer and more humid breathing gas, and a reduction in bubble noise. GEM is an acronym for Gas Extending Mechanism,

This is a passive addition SCR (PASCR), meaning that the amount of fresh gas added is controlled by the proportion of exhaled gas that flows through the breathing loop. This is a mechanical system, and is controlled by a patented valve system in the DSV housing. which dumps about a third of the gas from each exhalation to the ambient water. The make up gas comes from the ADV when the volume of the counterlung bottoms out during inhalation and loop pressure drops below ambient.

The proportion of recycled gas is fairly constant, so the gas mixture in the system is to the same extent predictable, and remains fairly constant. The GEM is an add on system comprising scrubber, counterlung's, loop hose's and DSV mouthpiece which will function with almost any single-hose scuba regulator, cylinder, BCD and harness with webbing straps, The scrubber head unit is fitted with two hose attachment points and an over-pressure exhaust valve. The scrubber canister carries a single Micropore ExtendAir #SR-0801C carbon dioxide absorbent cartridge.

== Sidewinder ==
The KISS Sidewinder is a range of sidemount diving rebreathers, originally manufactured by Jetsam Manufacturing, which was acquired in 2020 by Darkwater Group, which also owns XDEEP and SEAL Drysuits.

The original KISS Sidewinder was designed by the owner of KISS at the time, Mike Young, for a military veteran who had lost both legs. The Sidewinder is manually controlled closed circuit rebreather having a split-scrubber design with a single counterlung mounted over the diver's back connecting the two side-mounted scrubber canisters. Oxygen supply is from a transversely mounted scuba cylinder on the lower back, and diluent from an off-board side-mounted cylinder, also available for bailout gas, and usually balanced by a similar cylinder on the other side. This configuration is well balanced and promotes good diver trim with little effort, which was a factor in popularising the unit. The Sidewinder components are worn with the diver's preference of sidemount harness, as this is not a component of the system, making it easier for an open-circuit sidemount diver to adapt to the rebreather by using a familiar harness and buoyancy compensator. The Sidewinder uses a constant mass flow oxygen injector orifice with manual override, similar to the systems used on other KISS models. The Sidewinder was launched in 2016. The original Sidewinder was not CE certified, but the Sidewinder 2 will be.

The scrubber design used in the Sidewinder was taken from an earlier back mounted rebreather, the lightweight Orca Spirit, which was developed from the original KISS Classic.

=== Ergonomics ===
Sidemount rebreathers in general have ergonomic disadvantages. They are carried in the position where sidemount cylinders are carried, with a sidemount cylinder on the opposite side. This causes buoyancy distribution which varies during the dive, leading to changes in trim and a problem with space for a second cylinder for gas redundancy and a limited bailout capacity. Buoyancy distribution also varies during a breathing cycle as gas moves between the lungs and the counterlungs, which are offset longitudinally and laterally, affecting pitch and roll stability, thereby additionally task-loading the diver.

The Sidewinder addresses these problems by using a bilaterally symmetrical arrangement. The scrubber is split, and one unit worn on each side. They are relatively small, allowing the wearing of two sidemount cylinders, one on each side, which provide bailout and diluent redundancy. Carrying a low profile oxygen cylinder across the back keeps weight distribution symmetrical. A single counterlung between the scrubber canisters is close to the lung centroid on the longitudinal axis, and on the centreline, so gas movement between lungs and counterlung has little effect on longitudinal trim and almost no effect on lateral trim, reducing the task load of maintaining trim. Standard counterlung volume is nominally 10 litres, but is constrained by the fit and tightness of the harness. The scrubbers are small and do not greatly increase the cross section of the diver, which remains relatively streamlined, with a low profile. The split scrubber also reduces the chance of flooding the entire scrubbing system from a single leak.

=== Specifications ===
At 12.3 kg, the Sidewinder is relatively light, but not the lightest rebreather on the market. The weight excludes the diluent and bailout cylinders, which can be selected to suit the planned dive profile and other logistical and operational constraints.

- Scrubbers:Two axial scrubbers mounted to the sides of the harness, above the cylinders, carrying 2.8kg of absorbent material. Scrubber endurance 2.5 to 4 hours. Scrubbers are available with optional syntactic foam thermal insulation for cold water diving.
- Counterlung: Single cross-over/wraparound. over the upper back
- Oxygen supply: Onboard lower back transverse mounted cylinder with non-depth-compensated first stage.
- Oxygen addition: Constant mass flow orifice and manual addition.
- Oxygen cells: 3
- Diluent supply: Off-board side-mountted cylinder, available for bailout.
- Diluent addition: Automatic diluent valve (ADV) and manual addition.
- Most parts are user-serviceable

=== Loop arrangement and flow path ===
The dive/surface valve or bailout valve is connected on the right side to the exhalation hose, which is connected to the top of the exhalation (right) scrubber. The bottom of the exhalation scrubber connects to the counterlung inlet. The other side of the counterlung connects to the bottom of the inhalation scrubber, which connects to the inhalation hose at the top. This hose connects to the DSV/BOV on the left side. The automatic diluent valve (ADV) is on the top end of the exhalation scrubber canister and the auto dump valve (overpressure valve) is on the top of the inhalation scrubber canister. Oxygen feed enters the loop at the exhalation scrubber head. The oxygen cells are in the head of the inhalation scrubber canister. A non-return valve is fitted at the joint of the DSV/BOV to each of the breathing hoses.

== Sidewinder 2 ==
The KISS Sidewinder 2 is a major redesign based on the layout of the Sidewinder by Darkwater Group founder and CEO Piotr Czernik and KISS Training Director Patrick Widmann, One of the major changes in the Sidewinder 2 is the use of rectangular section scrubbers with flow from side to side across the rectangular section and gas spaces along the side faces for insulation of the absorbent. This makes the scrubber function longer before carbon dioxide breakthrough occurs, giving a more efficient use of the absorbent material and lower work of breathing. This is this due to shorter flow-path and larger cross-section area as well as more even temperature distribution across the section due to insulation. The scrubbers are functionally axial flow, with parallel flow direction through a constant cross section of absorbent, but across the canister rather than along its length. This configuration gives a shorter gas flow distance through the absorbent, but over a larger section area, so flow velocity is reduced, which reduces turbulence and work of breathing, and has been described as "cross-flow". The Sidewinder 2 scrubbers are also larger than those of the original Sidewinder, holding a total of 3.5 kg of sorb, which has been tested to last 4.5 hours at 40 msw and 4°C by a CE laboratory

== Training ==
To be eligible for training on a KISS rebreather, the diver must have nitrox certification, at least 20 logged dives and be 18 years or older, and for training on the Sidekick, also have technical diver certification to at least advanced nitrox level. The course generally takes 40 hours, over at least 4 days, of which at least 8 hours are dedicated to academic aspects and dry practical training.

Training may be provided through various agencies, and by a currently registered instructor for the specific rebreather model. Required skills include the ability to prepare the unit for use, following the checklist.
