= Jonathan Bird's Blue World =

- Logo
- Genre: Nature documentary
- Created by: Jonathan Bird
- Presented by: Jonathan Bird
- Country of origin: United States
- Original language: English
- No. of seasons: 9
- No. of episodes: 100+

Production
- Producers: Oceanic Research Group, Inc.
- Running time: 30 minutes

Original release
- Network: PBS
- Release: 2008 – present

Jonathan Bird's Blue World is an American underwater science and adventure television series hosted by underwater cinematographer Jonathan Bird. The series premiered in 2008 and is distributed to public television stations across the United States through the National Educational Telecommunications Association (NETA).

The program combines marine science education with underwater exploration, typically presenting two or more segments per episode focusing on animal behavior, scientific research, and underwater environments. The series has received multiple Emmy Awards.

In addition to broadcast television, the series is distributed digitally and has reached a global audience through platforms including YouTube and Apple TV. Internationally, the series has also been distributed under the title Blue World.

== Production ==
The series is produced by Oceanic Research Group. Early episodes were filmed in standard definition, with later seasons produced in high definition (HD) with production shifting to UHD in 2014.

Television episodes follow a magazine-style format, typically featuring multiple segments that explore marine life, scientific research, and underwater environments. Individual segments are released as "webisodes."

== Distribution ==
The series was distributed to public television stations in the United States through the National Educational Telecommunications Association (NETA) from 2008-2017. It has also aired on the AWE (A Wealth of Entertainment) cable network.

Internationally, the series has been distributed in more than 20 countries and is available through digital platforms including Apple TV, where it is accessible across multiple global regions.

== Episodes ==
Jonathan Bird's Blue World has produced over 250 webisodes (100 programs) across nine seasons since its premiere in 2008.

== Awards and nominations ==
- Won multiple New England Emmy Awards.
- Nominated for Daytime Emmy Awards in 2013-2016.
- Received a CINE Golden Eagle Award for the pilot episode.

== Educational use ==
The series is used as an educational resource, with accompanying lesson plans and curriculum materials aligned with science standards available through the program’s website. It is also available on the educational app Epic!

== See also ==
- Marine biology
- Underwater photography
- Public broadcasting in the United States
